= List of Ninja Warrior seasons =

Ninja Warrior is a reality television sports series originating in Japan, and produced in 26 countries worldwide. Each television season is the equivalent of a regulation sporting season, with a winner declared based on the best overall performance.

Each season, several hundred competitors will make their way through preliminary rounds of varying format, until a group of finalists is determined (typically around 100 in Asia and North America, and 25–40 in Europe). In the finals, competitors will typically attempt a series of four consecutive, increasingly difficult stages. Hitting the buzzer on the Final Stage will award the competitor with the additional title of Total Victory. To date, more than 180 regulation seasons have broadcast worldwide.

For a list of all season winners, best performances by women, and Total Victories, please see List of best results on Ninja Warrior.

== Inclusion Criteria ==
Shows that will be considered a regulation seasons must meet the following criteria:

- The show must be legally licensed by TBS Television (Japan).
- Performance must be entirely individual. Any seasons with relays, or advancement based on team performance, is not eligible.

Special considerations:

- Super Ninja was a direct continuation of the licensed Russian Ninja, which was forced to rebrand due to controversy surrounding host Morgenshtern, a restricted ability to re-license the show following sanctions regarding the Russian invasion of Ukraine, and the desire to ensure continued competition for fans despite the preceding circumstances. These buzzers are listed and are considered regulation, however no official production number is allocated.

== Buzzers ==
In Ninja Warrior, the main scoring mechanism for stages is a buzzer. A buzzer is a button present at the end of each stage that signifies completion. Due to variations in format, a buzzer is not always required to advance to the next stage, especially in preliminary rounds. In some cases, a buzzer does not guarantee advance if a high volume of buzzers occurs.

== Regulation seasons overview ==
The following tables dictates the season or series in question for the franchise as a whole.

For a list of series abbreviations, please refer to the International Ninja Warrior series table.

(+#) Indicates extra buzzers. In normal circumstances, only one buzzer per competitor per stage is counted, for clears. In Ninja Warrior Poland season 10 onward and American Ninja Warrior seasons 15 and 16, additional runs were allowed on stages, and these were racing stages. These extra buzzers indicate clears by the losers in the races, as well as additional clears past the first.

Prod No.	Season	Episodes	Start	Finish	Finalists	National Finals Buzzers					Finals Viewership (in millions)
Prod No.	Season	Episodes	Start	Finish	Finalists	1st	2nd	3rd	Final	FD	Finals Viewership (in millions)
1	(Japan) SSK 1	1	27 September 1997		100	23	6	4	0	—	10.54
2	(Japan) SSK 2	1	26 September 1998		100	34	9	2	0	—	12.95
3	(Japan) SSK 3	1	13 March 1999		97	13	6	5	0	—	12.15
4	(Japan) SSK 4	1	16 October 1999		100	37	11	1	1	—	13.01
5	(Japan) SSK 5	1	18 March 2000		100	3	1	0	—	—	13.21
6	(Japan) SSK 6	1	9 September 2000		100	5	5	0	—	—	14.67
7	(Japan) SSK 7	1	17 March 2001		100	8	5	1	0	—	17.51
8	(Japan) SSK 8	1	29 September 2001		100	6	4	2	0	—	17.37
9	(Japan) SSK 9	1	16 March 2002		100	7	4	0	—	—	13.39
10	(Japan) SSK 10	1	25 September 2002		98	5	4	0	—	—	13.32
11	(Japan) SSK 11	1	21 March 2003		100	11	7	1	0	—	11.18
12	(Japan) SSK 12	1	1 October 2003		99	11	10	3	0	—	12.62
13	(Japan) SSK 13	10	29 October 2003	6 April 2004	100	10	5	1	0	—	12.52
14	(Japan) SSK 14	1	4 January 2005		100	14	10	0	—	—	13.03
15	(Japan) SSK 15	1	20 July 2005		100	7	6	0	—	—	10.80
16	(Japan) SSK 16	1	30 December 2005		100	16	8	0	—	—	10.11
17	(Japan) SSK 17	1	11 October 2006		100	11	8	2	1	—	10.33
18	(Japan) SSK 18	1	21 March 2007		99	6	3	0	—	—	12.39
19	(Japan) SSK 19 / (United States) ANC 1	2	19 September 2007		97	2	0	—	—	—	10.76
20	(Japan) SSK 20 / (United States) ANC 2	6	26 March 2008		100	3	1	0	—	—	10.27
21	(Japan) SSK 21 / (United States) ANC 3	11	28 July 2008	17 September 2008	101	9	3	0	—	—	8.70
22	(Japan) SSK 22 / (United States) ANC 4	2	30 March 2009		101	5	4	1	0	—	10.66
23	(Japan) SSK 23 / (United States) ANW 1	9	27 September 2009	19 December 2009	102	16	7	2	0	—	10.23
24	(Japan) SSK 24	1	1 January 2010		100	12	7	5	1	—	8.63
25	(Japan) SSK 25	1	28 March 2010		99	11	5	0	—	—	5.53
26	(Japan) SSK 26 / (United States) ANW 2	11	8 December 2010	2 January 2011	101	10	6	0	—	—	6.68
27	(Japan) SSK 27 / (United States) ANW 3	11	31 July 2011	3 October 2011	99	27	10	2	1	—	9.35
28	(United States) ANW 4	24	20 May 2012	23 July 2012	100	24	1	0	—	—	4.87
29	(Japan) SSK 28	1	27 December 2012		100	5	3	0	—	—	6.95
30	(Japan) SSK 29	1	27 June 2013		99	21	4	0	—	—	7.22
31	(United States) ANW 5	21	30 June 2013	16 September 2013	85	21	7	0	—	—	5.81
32	(United States) ANW 6	14	26 May 2014	8 September 2014	90	18	2	0	—	—	5.83
33	(Japan) SSK 30	1	3 July 2014		98	27	9	2	0	—	7.57
34	(Turkey) NWTU 1	12.5	17 September 2014	12 December 2014	11	8	3	0	—	—	Unknown
35	(Sweden) NWSV 1	10	29 January 2015	26 March 2015	25	3	3	0	—	—	Unknown
36	(United Kingdom) NWUK 1	8	11 April 2015	30 May 2015	14	6	0	—	—	—	4.08
37	(United States) ANW 7	16	25 May 2015	14 September 2015	100	38	8	2	2	—	7.32
38	(Vietnam) SVN 1	18	18 June 2015	5 November 2015	245	99	9	0	—	—	Unknown
39	(Japan) SSK 31	1	1 July 2015		99	17	8	1	1	—	8.15
40	(Turkey) NWTU 2	7.5	11 July 2015	29 August 2015	8	5	1	0	—	—	Unknown
41	(Denmark) DNW	10	7 September 2015	12 November 2015	24	9	2	0	—	—	Unknown
42	(Indonesia) SNWI 1	20	20 December 2015	1 May 2016	110	15	11	3	0	—	Unknown
43	(United Kingdom) NWUK 2	8	2 January 2016	13 February 2016	15	3	0	—	—	—	3.72
44	(Sweden) NWSV 2	12	4 February 2016	21 April 2016	25	6	2	0	—	—	Unknown
45	(Indonesia) IOM 1	5	8 May 2016	5 June 2016	49	11	6	1	0	—	Unknown
46	(Vietnam) SVN 2	18	19 May 2016	29 September 2016	183	87	38	12	3	—	Unknown
47	(United States) ANW 8	13	1 June 2016	12 September 2016	90	17	2	0	—	—	7.01
48	(Japan) SSK 32	1	3 July 2016	3 July 2016	100	8	8	0	—	—	8.36
49	(France) LPDH 1	5	8 July 2016	12 August 2016	20	2	2	0	—	—	2.97
50	(Germany) NWG 1	5	9 July 2016	30 July 2016	28	1	0	—	—	—	3.11
51	(Italy) NWIT	10	16 October 2016	18 December 2016	20	5	1	0	—	—	0.32
52	(United Kingdom) NWUK 3	8	31 December 2016	18 February 2017	15	6	2	0	—	—	4.18
53	(Netherlands) NWNL	8	9 March 2017	27 April 2017	15	9	2	0	—	—	Unknown
54	(Japan) SSK 33	1	26 March 2017	26 March 2017	100	13	5	0	—	—	7.33
55	(Egypt) NWBA	13	27 March 2017	31 July 2017	240	8	0	—	—	—	Unknown
56	(Spain) NWES 1	5	9 June 2017	7 July 2017	24	13	4	0	—	—	2.16
57	(United States) ANW 9	15	12 June 2017	18 September 2017	95	41	3	0	—	—	6.29
58	(Vietnam) SVN 3	13	22 June 2017	5 October 2017	149	27	14	0	—	—	Unknown
59	(France) LPDH 2	5	23 June 2017	21 July 2017	24	10	3	1	0	—	4.70
60	(Indonesia) SNWI 2	22	5 July 2017	30 September 2017	100	27	3	1	0	—	Unknown
61	(Australia) AuNW 1	9	9 July 2017	25 July 2017	21	9	0	—	—	—	2.16
62	(Germany) NWG 2	9	12 August 2017	1 October 2017	28	5	3	0	—	—	3.27
63	(Indonesia) IOM 2	4	1 October 2017	14 October 2017	8	5	0	—	—	—	Unknown
64	(Japan) SSK 34	1	8 October 2017	8 October 2017	100	24	9	0	—	—	6.94
65	(Indonesia) ISP	4	15 October 2017	28 October 2017	9	6	0	—	—	—	Unknown
66	(Hungary) NWH 1	10	16 October 2017	14 December 2017	20	10	3	0	—	—	0.79
67	(Austria) NWAT 1	6	24 October 2017	28 November 2017	25	2	2	0	—	—	0.33
68	(Indonesia) IIC	5	25 November 2017	23 December 2017	20	19	10	0	—	—	Unknown
69	(Russia) RNNW 1	8	26 November 2017	28 January 2018	21	5	1	0	—	—	Unknown
70	(Japan) SSK 35	1	26 March 2018	26 March 2018	100	8	5	1	0	—	8.15
71	(Spain) NWES 2	6	6 April 2018	5 May 2018	25	5	3	1	0	—	1.70
72	(United Kingdom) NWUK 4	8	14 April 2018	9 June 2018	30	8	5	0	—	—	2.81
73	(United States) ANW 10	15	30 May 2018	10 September 2018	97	30	2	0	—	—	5.86
74	(Australia) AuNW 2	12	8 July 2018	31 July 2018	32	24	0	—	—	—	1.19
75	(Israel) NIL 1	25	25 July 2018	10 November 2018	28	5	4	1	0	—	0.75
76	(Vietnam) SVN 4	19	18 August 2018	12 January 2019	160	42	27	0	—	—	Unknown
77	(France) LPDH 3	6	31 August 2018	5 October 2018	25	4	2	0	—	—	3.45
78	(Romania) NWRO	8	9 September 2018	28 October 2018	25	5	0	—	—	—	Unknown
79	(Germany) NWG 3	9	21 September 2018	23 November 2018	28	10	5	1	0	—	3.00
80	(Russia) RNNW 2	8	7 October 2018	25 November 2018	21	9	2	0	—	—	Unknown
81	(Hungary) NWH 2	10	8 October 2018	10 December 2018	20	5	2	0	—	—	0.53
82	(Switzerland) NWSW 1	6	16 October 2018	20 November 2018	25	7	5	0	—	—	0.19
83	(Japan) SSK 36	1	31 December 2018	31 December 2018	100	15	10	1	0	—	7.07
84	(United Kingdom) NWUK 5	5	13 April 2019	1 June 2019	19	15	8	1	1	—	3.85
85	(United States) ANW 11	16	29 May 2019	16 September 2019	86	28	21	2	1	—	4.93
86	(France) LPDH 4	5	5 July 2019	2 August 2019	27	11	7	3	2	—	3.14
87	(Australia) AuNW 3	10	8 July 2019	29 July 2019	30	11	5	0	—	—	1.30
88	(Israel) NIL 2	35	20 July 2019	3 January 2019	28	2	1	0	—	—	0.81
89	(Vietnam) SVN 5	17	22 July 2019	2 December 2019	126	45	15	0	—	—	Unknown
90	(Poland) NWP 1	7	3 September 2019	15 October 2019	24	4	1	0	—	—	1.44
91	(Germany) NWG 4	9	13 September 2019	8 November 2019	27	19	4	0	—	—	2.88
92	(Mongolia) MNWS	12	29 September 2019	15 December 2019	140	48	7	0	—	—	Unknown
93	(Switzerland) NWSW 2	6	29 October 2019	10 December 2019	25	10	4	0	—	—	0.16
94	(Japan) SSK 37	1	31 December 2019	31 December 2019	97	10	8	2	0	—	5.19
95	(Austria) NWAT 2	7	6 July 2020	10 August 2020	24	4	3	0	—	—	0.28
96	(Australia) AuNW 4	8	26 July 2020	10 August 2020	24	8	4	3	3	—	1.14
97	(Poland) NWP 2	2	1 September 2020	13 October 2020	24	8	4	0	—	—	1.19
98	(United States) ANW 12	8	7 September 2020	6 November 2020	27	7	—	—	—	13	2.97
99	(Israel) NIL 3	39	26 September 2020	6 February 2021	29	12	10	0	—	—	0.63
100	(Germany) NWG 5	10	2 October 2020	4 December 2020	56	16	13	0	—	—	3.56
101	(Japan) SSK 38	1	29 December 2020	29 December 2020	100	14	5	1	1	—	8.68
102	(France) LPDH 5	5	2 January 2021	30 January 2021	28	5	5	1	0	—	4.07
103	(Poland) NWP 3	7	2 March 2021	13 April 2021	24	12	5	0	—	—	1.15
104	(Germany) GAS 1	6	21 April 2021	9 May 2021	20	15	6	1	—	2	1.91
105	(United States) ANW 13	12	31 May 2021	13 September 2021	68	27	4	1	0	—	3.66
106	(Australia) AuNW 5	9	20 June 2021	6 July 2021	28	10	2	0	—	—	0.88
107	(Poland) NWP 4	7	31 August 2021	12 October 2021	24	5	3	1	0	—	1.05
108	(Germany) NWG 6	11	15 October 2021	18 December 2021	40	28	12	2	2	—	2.25
109	(Hungary) NWH 3	20	25 October 2021	19 November 2021	33	6	6	2	0	—	0.51
110	(Russia) RNNW 3	8	22 November 2021	10 January 2022	21	3	1	0	—	—	Unknown
111	(Israel) NIL 4	31	15 December 2021	5 March 2022	23	3	3	3	2	—	0.77
112	(Japan) SSK 39	1	28 December 2021	28 December 2021	100	14	9	0	—	—	7.90
113	(France) LPDH 6	5	7 January 2022	11 February 2022	23	9	7	4	2	—	2.47
114	(Austria) NWAT 3	7	14 February 2022	28 March 2022	24	10	5	1	1	—	0.41
115	(Poland) NWP 5	7	1 March 2022	12 April 2022	24	2	2	0	—	—	0.96
116	(Germany) GAS 2	6	22 April 2022	22 May 2022	20	15	4	2	—	2	1.34
117	(United States) ANW 14	12	6 June 2022	29 August 2022	69	25	11	5	0	—	3.14
118	(Australia) AuNW 6	9	27 June 2022	11 July 2022	36	12	5	0	—	—	0.56
119	(Poland) NWP 6	7	30 August 2022	11 October 2022	24	17	7	0	—	—	0.89
120	(United Kingdom) NWUK 6 (Men)	8	10 September 2022	29 December 2022	8	3	—	—	—	2	1.61
121	(United Kingdom) NWUK 6 (Women)	8	10 September 2022	29 December 2022	8	3	—	—	—	2	1.61
122	(Germany) NWG 7	9	30 September 2022	18 November 2022	40	7	7	2	0	—	2.30
123	(Japan) SSK 40	6	27 December 2022	27 December 2022	100	24	12	3	0	—	8.42
124	(France) LPDH 7	6	7 January 2023	11 February 2023	33	9	13	5	0	—	2.17
125	(Israel) NIL 5	26	8 January 2023	3 April 2023	18	2	2	2	2	—	0.57
—	(Russia) SUN 1	9	13 February 2023	10 April 2023	33	6	—	—	—	1	Unknown
126	(Poland) NWP 7	7	28 February 2023	11 April 2023	30	10	7	2	0	—	0.87
127	(United States) ANW 15	14	5 June 2023	11 September 2023	72	18	9	8	2	—	3.30
128	(France) LPDH 8	6	7 July 2023	11 August 2023	33	15	9	3	2	—	2.14
129	(Poland) NWP 8	7	5 September 2023	17 October 2023	30	13	7	4	0	—	0.61
—	(Russia) SUN 2	9	9 October 2023	11 December 2023	30	3	—	—	—	2	Unknown
130	(Germany) NWG 8	10	13 October 2023	15 December 2023	37	7	6	1	0	—	2.37
131	(Japan) SSK 41	7	27 December 2023	27 December 2023	100	21	15	0	—	—	8.93
132	(Poland) NWP 9	7	5 March 2024	16 April 2024	30	8	6	2	1	—	0.73
133	(United States) ANW 16	11	3 June 2024	9 September 2024	74	26	14 (+7)	5	2	—	2.51
—	(Russia) SUN 3	9	13 October 2024	15 December 2024	30	3	—	—	—	1	Unknown
134	(Germany) NWG 9	10	18 October 2024	13 December 2024	40	17	9	3	0	—	2.04
135	(Japan) SSK 42	14	25 December 2024	25 December 2024	100	28	16	1	0	—	8.13
136	(Poland) NWP 10	8	4 March 2025	22 April 2025	30	30 (+12)	14	7	—	2	0.78
137	(United States) ANW 17	13	2 June 2025	25 August 2025	60	—	—	—	—	—	Unknown
138	(France) LPDH 9	6	4 July 2025	8 August 2025	30	14	16	7	1	—	Unknown
139	(Poland) NWP 11	8	2 September 2025	21 October 2025	30	—	—	—	—	—	Unknown
—	(Russia) SUN 4	—	—	—	—	—	—	—	—	—	Unknown
140	(Germany) NWG 10	12	19 September 2025	12 December 2025	39	12	2	1	0	—	Unknown
141	(Japan) SSK 43	2	24 December 2025	25 December 2025	121	12	10	1	0	—	Unknown
142	(Poland) NWP 12	8	3 March 2026	28 April 2026	36	—	—	—	—	—	Unknown
143	(United States) ANW 18		8 June 2026								
144	(Vietnam) SVN 6										
145	(Germany) NWG 11										
146	(Israel) NIL 6										
150	Franchise Total	1,201	27 September 1997	Present	8,895	1,975 (+12)	812 (+7)	152	35	27	

== Regulation pre-seasons overview ==
During the preliminary rounds, competitors will compete on between one and four stages to earn a place in the national finals. However, the following series have a different format from that of two preliminary rounds:

- Sasuke 13, Sasuke 29, and X Warrior: Sasuke China featured only a single stage.
- Ninja Warrior Türkiye season 1 featured two stages, but competitors would attempt the semifinal round two or three time each, with less runners each time.
- Ninja Warrior UK seasons 2–5 featured two rounds, with the second round containing two stages.
- Ninja Warrior Italia, Ninja Warrior Germany seasons 2–4, Ninja Warrior Romania and Ninja Warrior Hungary seasons 1–2 featured a third preliminary round.
- American Ninja Warrior seasons 15–16 and Ninja Israel season 3 featured an additional runoff round during heats.
- Ninja Israel seasons 4-5 featured two additional runoff rounds, one during heats and a second during semifinals.
- Ninja Warrior Hungary season 3 featured four preliminary rounds plus a runoff stage

=== Advancement Criteria ===
In each heat, a specified number of advances is designated (typically between 10 and 30), with the farthest, fastest results advancing. A semifinal round will also occur, with a smaller amount (between 1 and 15) advancing. Since 2017, several shows will additionally specify a number of top women to advance, if there are not a certain amount in the top overall. In the case of more competitors clearing than the allocation, some series such as American Ninja Warrior and Sasuke Ninja Warrior Indonesia will allow all clears to advance. In rare cases such as Ninja Warrior UK season 5 and Sasuke 29, no specified amount was set and instead anyone who cleared could advance.

When preliminary rounds are head-to-head races, the winner of each pair will typically advance. Ninja Israel season 5 and Australian Ninja Warrior season 6 additionally required competitors to continue on a solo course directly after completing their race.

✓ Indicates this reward is earned through an α Stage during the initial preliminary heats

✓ Indicates this reward is earned through a fastest-time during the semifinals

Prod No.	Season	Start	Finish	Competitors	Preliminary Stage Buzzers								α Stage Rewards	
Prod No.	Season	Start	Finish	Competitors	1st-Lite		2nd-Lite		1st EX		Mega	HSG	Heats	Semifinals
13	(Japan) SSK 13	29 October 2003	6 April 2004	224	15		—		—		—	—		
21	(Japan) SSK 21 / (United States) ANC 3	28 July 2008	17 September 2008	80	33		—		19		—	—		
23	(Japan) SSK 23 / (United States) ANW 1	27 September 2009	19 December 2009	300	55		—		22		—	—		
26	(Japan) SSK 26 / (United States) ANW 2	8 December 2010	2 January 2011	300	47		—		10		—	—		
27	(Japan) SSK 27 / (United States) ANW 3	31 July 2011	3 October 2011	300	48		—		1		—	—		
28	(United States) ANW 4	20 May 2012	23 July 2012	600	127		—		77		—	—		
30	(Japan) SSK 29	27 June 2013		161	46		—		—		—	—		
31	(United States) ANW 5	30 June 2013	16 September 2013	600	110		—		26		—	—		
32	(United States) ANW 6	26 May 2014	8 September 2014	600	128		—		31		—	—		
34	(Turkey) NWTU 1	17 September 2014	12 December 2014	330	64		—		53	21	—	—		
35	(Sweden) NWSV 1	29 January 2015	26 March 2015	116	66		—		17		—	—		
36	(United Kingdom) NWUK 1	11 April 2015	30 May 2015	250	53		—		16		—	—		
37	(United States) ANW 7	25 May 2015	14 September 2015	750	117		—		11		—	—		
Q-5	(China) SXW	9 June 2015	7 October 2015	350	82		—		—		—	—		
40	(Turkey) NWTU 2	11 July 2015	29 August 2015	240	59		—		9		—	—		
41	(Denmark) DNW	7 September 2015	12 November 2015	110	60		—		16		—	—		
42	(Indonesia) SNWI 1	20 December 2015	1 May 2016	500	217	110	—		—		—	—		
43	(United Kingdom) NWUK 2	2 January 2016	13 February 2016	250	19	18	—		12		—	—		
44	(Sweden) NWSV 2	4 February 2016	21 April 2016	109	45		—		11		—	—		
45	(Indonesia) IOM 1	8 May 2016	5 June 2016	99	65	48	—		—		—	—		
47	(United States) ANW 8	1 June 2016	12 September 2016	750	93		—		11		—	—		
49	(France) LPDH 1	8 July 2016	12 August 2016	150	26		—		16		—	—		
50	(Germany) NWG 1	9 July 2016	30 July 2016	240	46		31		—		—	—		
51	(Italy) NWIT	16 October 2016	18 December 2016	200	23		22		14		—	—		
52	(United Kingdom) NWUK 3	31 December 2016	18 February 2017	250	49	27	—		23		—	—		
53	(Netherlands) NWNL	9 March 2017	27 April 2017	250	46		—		15		—	—		
56	(Spain) NWES 1	9 June 2017	7 July 2017	200	32		18		—		—	—		
57	(United States) ANW 9	12 June 2017	18 September 2017	750	88		—		9		—	—		
59	(France) LPDH 2	23 June 2017	21 July 2017	200	23		15		—		—	—		
60	(Indonesia) SNWI 2	5 July 2017	30 September 2017	550	89	47	—		—		—	—		
61	(Australia) AuNW 1	9 July 2017	25 July 2017	250	59		—		19		—	—		
62	(Germany) NWG 2	12 August 2017	1 October 2017	350	70		39		31		—	—		
63	(Indonesia) IOM 2	1 October 2017	14 October 2017	99	36	8	—		—		—	—		
65	(Indonesia) ISP	15 October 2017	28 October 2017	73	25	9	—		—		—	—		
66	(Hungary) NWH 1	16 October 2017	14 December 2017	330	66		48		9		—	—		
67	(Austria) NWAT 1	24 October 2017	28 November 2017	200	45		24		—		—	—		
68	(Indonesia) IIC	25 November 2017	23 December 2017	20	11	13	—		—		—	—		
69	(Russia) RNNW 1	26 November 2017	28 January 2018	225	69		21		—		—	—		
71	(Spain) NWES 2	6 April 2018	5 May 2018	250	47		29		—		—	—		
72	(United Kingdom) NWUK 4	14 April 2018	9 June 2018	200	38	16	—		10		—	—		
73	(United States) ANW 10	30 May 2018	10 September 2018	750	70		—		28		6	—		
74	(Australia) AuNW 2	8 July 2018	31 July 2018	300	59		—		10		—	—		
75	(Israel) NIL 1	25 July 2018	10 November 2018	320	43		15		—		—	—		
77	(France) LPDH 3	31 August 2018	5 October 2018	250	29		22		—		—	—		
78	(Romania) NWRO	9 September 2018	28 October 2018	200	29		16		17		—	—		
79	(Germany) NWG 3	21 September 2018	23 November 2018	350	82		36		14		—	—		
80	(Russia) RNNW 2	7 October 2018	25 November 2018	225	63		27		—		—	—		
81	(Hungary) NWH 2	8 October 2018	10 December 2018	300	32		30		12		—	—		
82	(Switzerland) NWSW 1	16 October 2018	20 November 2018	160	47		8		—		—	—		
84	(United Kingdom) NWUK 5	13 April 2019	1 June 2019	200	40	25	—		14		—	—		
85	(United States) ANW 11	29 May 2019	16 September 2019	750	74		—		19		9	—	Speed Pass	Safety Pass
86	(France) LPDH 4	5 July 2019	2 August 2019	200	42		29		—		3	—		Cash Prize
87	(Australia) AuNW 3	8 July 2019	29 July 2019	200	25		—		12		12	—		
88	(Israel) NIL 2	20 July 2019	3 January 2019	320	70		13		—		8	—		
90	(Poland) NWP 1	3 September 2019	15 October 2019	204	47		12		—		—	—		
91	(Germany) NWG 4	13 September 2019	8 November 2019	294	72		25		4		11	—		
93	(Switzerland) NWSW 2	29 October 2019	10 December 2019	160	36		15		—		—	—		
95	(Austria) NWAT 2	6 July 2020	10 August 2020	240	30		25		—		—	—		
96	(Australia) AuNW 4	26 July 2020	10 August 2020	160	21		—		17		—	—	Headstart	Safety Pass
97	(Poland) NWP 2	1 September 2020	13 October 2020	192	47		16		—		—	—		
98	(United States) ANW 12	7 September 2020	6 November 2020	150	47		—		11		3	—	Guestlist	
99	(Israel) NIL 3	26 September 2020	6 February 2021	320	59	7	14		—		12	—		
100	(Germany) NWG 5	2 October 2020	4 December 2020	330	39		—		22		10	—	Speed Pass	
102	(France) LPDH 5	2 January 2021	30 January 2021	200	29		26		—		4	—		Joker
103	(Poland) NWP 3	2 March 2021	13 April 2021	192	46		21		—		—	—		
104	(Germany) GAS 1	21 April 2021	9 May 2021	160	68		19		—		—	—		
105	(United States) ANW 13	31 May 2021	13 September 2021	500	55		—		27		4	—		Safety Pass
106	(Australia) AuNW 5	20 June 2021	6 July 2021	160	22		—		9		—	—	Speed Pass	Safety Pass
107	(Poland) NWP 4	31 August 2021	12 October 2021	192	62		11		—		—	—	Golden Ticket	
108	(Germany) NWG 6	15 October 2021	18 December 2021	280	36		20		—		6	—	Speed Pass	Speed Reward
109	(Hungary) NWH 3	25 October 2021	19 November 2021	360	58		41		27	17	—	—		Repechage
110	(Russia) RNNW 3	22 November 2021	10 January 2022	225	64		24		—		—	—	Golden Ticket	
111	(Israel) NIL 4	15 December 2021	5 March 2022	166	40	1	8		—		9	2	Cash Prize	
113	(France) LPDH 6	7 January 2022	11 February 2022	200	55		20		—		7	—		Joker
114	(Austria) NWAT 3	14 February 2022	28 March 2022	240	38		26		—		—	—		
115	(Poland) NWP 5	1 March 2022	12 April 2022	180	47		8		—		—	—	Golden Ticket	
116	(Germany) GAS 2	22 April 2022	22 May 2022	160	101		27		—		—	—		
117	(United States) ANW 14	6 June 2022	29 August 2022	250	64		—		17		10	—		Safety Pass
118	(Australia) AuNW 6	27 June 2022	11 July 2022	160	27	45	—		7		—	—	Matchmaker	Safety Pass
119	(Poland) NWP 6	30 August 2022	11 October 2022	169	46		6		—		—	—	Golden Ticket	
120	(United Kingdom) NWUK 6 (Men)	10 September 2022	29 December 2022	112	36		—		6		—	—		
121	(United Kingdom) NWUK 6 (Women)	10 September 2022	29 December 2022	112	8	9	—		—		—	—		
122	(Germany) NWG 7	30 September 2022	18 November 2022	300	46		54		—		5	—	Speed Pass	Speed Reward
123	(Japan) SSK 40	27 December 2022	27 December 2022	10	2		—		—		—	—		
124	(France) LPDH 7	7 January 2023	11 February 2023	200	15		29		—		5	—		Joker
125	(Israel) NIL 5	8 January 2023	3 April 2023	202	29	1	—		13	1	11	2	Cash Prize	
—	(Russia) SUN 1	13 February 2023	10 April 2023	175	20		39		—		—	—		
126	(Poland) NWP 7	28 February 2023	11 April 2023	168	41		14		—		—	—	Golden Ticket	
127	(United States) ANW 15	5 June 2023	11 September 2023	400	34		41		—		4	—	Repechage	Safety Pass
128	(France) LPDH 8	7 July 2023	11 August 2023	200	40		29		—		1	—		Joker
129	(Poland) NWP 8	5 September 2023	17 October 2023	170	62		19		—		—	—	Golden Ticket	
—	(Russia) SUN 2	9 October 2023	11 December 2023	175	22		40		—		—	—		
130	(Germany) NWG 8	13 October 2023	15 December 2023	250	66		5		—		6	12	Speed Pass	Speed Reward
131	(Japan) SSK 41	27 December 2023	27 December 2023	17	8		—		—		—	—		
132	(Poland) NWP 9	5 March 2024	16 April 2024	174	48		20		—		—	—	Golden Ticket	
133	(United States) ANW 16	3 June 2024	9 September 2024	400	55		51		—		2	—	Repechage	Safety Pass
—	(Russia) SUN 3	13 October 2024	15 December 2024	175	17		51		—		—	—		
134	(Germany) NWG 9	18 October 2024	13 December 2024	250	34		31		—		2	13	Speed Pass	Speed Reward
135	(Japan) SSK 42	25 December 2024	25 December 2024	14	5		—		—		—	—		
136	(Poland) NWP 10	4 March 2025	22 April 2025	168	82	65	30	39	—		—	—	Golden Ticket	
140	Franchise Total	29 October 2003	Present	~25,740	5,517		1,299		813		150	29		

== Women's-only regulation seasons overview ==
In Japan and the United States, a total of 16 women's only seasons have been broadcast. These seasons featured a combination of modified courses with increased time limits, as well as entirely original courses focused more on balance. Due to the difference in this formatting, these buzzers are considered regulation, but are counted separately from the main buzzers.

Prod No.	Code	Broadcast	Finalists	National Finals Buzzers					Finals Viewership (in millions)
Prod No.	Code	Broadcast	Finalists	1st	2nd	3rd	Final	FD	Finals Viewership (in millions)
W-1	(Japan) KNI 1	22 December 2001	90	2	0	—	—	—	9.90
W-2	(Japan) KNI 2	21 December 2002	100	3	2	2	0	—	10.67
W-3	(Japan) KNI 3	24 September 2003	100	14	11	3	0	—	11.80
W-4	(Japan) KNI 4	25 December 2004	100	8	6	1	1	—	11.20
W-5	(Japan) KNI 5	7 January 2006	100	6	5	2	1	—	7.31
W-6	(Japan) KNI 6	20 September 2006	100	11	8	2	1	—	10.47
W-7	(Japan) KNI 7	5 September 2007	100	4	1	0	—	—	8.99
W-8	(Japan) KNI 8	7 October 2009	100	26	5	—	2	—	6.89
W-9	(Japan) KNI 9	12 February 2017	50	5	1	—	0	—	7.02
W-10	(Japan) KNI 10	2 July 2017	50	6	3	0	—	—	6.09
W-11	(Japan) KNI 11	1 July 2018	50	10	4	1	—	—	5.43
W-12	(United States) AWC 1	9 May 2021	12	6	1	—	—	6	
W-13	(United States) AWC 2	8 May 2022	12	6	3	—	—	6	
W-14	(United States) AWC 3	29 May 2023	13	3	1	—	—	6	
W-15	(United States) AWC 4	12 May 2024	16	3	2	—	—	6	
W-16	(Japan) KNI 12	13 January 2025	50	6	6	1	1	—	6.06
W-17	(Japan) KNI 13	24 November 2025	50	12	4	2	0	—	
17	Franchise Total	Present	1,105	131	60	14	6	24	

== Youth division regulation seasons overview ==
In Japan, Germany, Israel and Russia, modified seasons for children 14 and under have been broadcast. In every case, these feature a modified finals courses that consists of only two stages. Due to the difference in formatting, these are counted separately. Due to its racing format and lack of course advancement, American Ninja Warrior Junior is not considered a regulation series.

Prod No.	Code	Subdivision	Episodes	Start	Finish	Finalists	National Finals Buzzers		
Prod No.	Code	Subdivision	Episodes	Start	Finish	Finalists	1st	Final	FD
J-1	(Japan) SJR 1		Unknown	4 July 1998	Unknown	100	0	—	—
J-2	(Japan) SJR 2		Unknown	10 April 1999	Unknown	100	1	0	—
J-3	(Japan) SJR 3		Unknown	3 July 1999	Unknown	100	2	0	—
J-4	(Japan) SJR 4		Unknown	12 February 2000	Unknown	100	0	—	—
J-5	(Japan) SJR 5		4	2 June 2001	18 August 2001	100	3	2	—
J-6	(Japan) SJR 6		6	30 May 2003	6 September 2003	50	5	—	—
J-7	(Israel) NIC		24	11 November 2019	29 January 2020	6	2	1	—
J-8	(Germany) GKI 1	Ages 10–11	7	17 July 2020	17 August 2020	6	6	—	2
J-9	(Germany) GKI 1	Ages 12–13	7	24 August 2020	14 September 2020	6	6	—	2
J-10	(Germany) GKI 2		8	10 October 2021	31 October 2021	6	6	—	3
—	(Russia) SNK 1	Ages 9–10	9	5 May 2024	7 July 2024	10	1	1	—
—	(Russia) SNK 1	Ages 11–12	9	5 May 2024	7 July 2024	9	3	—	1
—	(Russia) SNK 1	Ages 13–14	9	5 May 2024	7 July 2024	9	4	—	2
13	Franchise Total		>75	4 July 1998	Present	602	39	4	88

== Modified format regulation individual seasons overview ==
Below is a list of seasons that are considered regulation seasons, but due to the following factors, they are not considered to be core installments.

- Unique competition division: Pancratium and Sasuke Senior are considered to be in unique divisions due to their age and obstacle distinctions.
- Truncated courses: Sasuke Malaysia and Sasuke Singapore feature only a 1st Stage followed by a Final Stage. Sasuke China and Sasuke Senior featured only the 1st Stage.
- Extended Qualification: The celebrity editions of Ninja Warrior Germany and Ninja Warrior Switzerland, as well as Ninja Israel: All Stars, feature a qualifiers 1st-Lite stage, followed by a 2nd-Lite stage, followed by the Final Stage tower.

Prod No.	Season	Episodes	Start	Finish	Finalists	National Finals Results		
Prod No.	Season	Episodes	Start	Finish	Finalists	1st	2nd	Final
S-1	(Japan) SSR	4	14 June 2003	6 September 2003	50	0	—	—
P-1	(Japan) PPS 1	1	—	27 April 2004	11	2	0	—
P-2	(Japan) PPS 2	1	—	26 May 2004	5	2	0	—
Q-1	(Malaysia) SMY 1	7	3 June 2012	15 July 2012	100	5	—	4
Q-2	(Singapore) SSG 1	6	8 August 2012	12 September 2012	100	17	—	15
Q-3	(Malaysia) SMY 2	1	28 November 2012		100	5	—	—
Q-4	(Singapore) SSG 2	6	5 December 2012	23 January 2013	100	15	—	11
Q-5	(China) SXW	18	9 June 2015	7 October 2015	35	9	—	—
C-1	(Germany) GPS 1	1	24 November 2017		23	9	2	1
C-2	(Germany) GPS 2	1	23 November 2018		26	TBC	TBC	2
C-3	(Switzerland) SWPS 1	1	4 December 2018		19	7	TBC	1
C-4	(Germany) GPS 3	1	22 November 2019		21	5	2	3
C-5	(Switzerland) SWPS 2	1	3 December 2019		18	TBC	TBC	1
C-6	(Germany) GPS 4	1	13 December 2020		21	4	0	0
C-7	(Switzerland) SWPS 3	1	22 September 2021		21	TBC	TBC	1
C-8	(Germany) GPS 5	1	12 December 2021		18	4	0	2
C-9	(Germany) GPS 6	1	30 October 2022		20	5	4	0
—	(Israel) IAS 2	1	20 April 2023		8	1	—	0
C-10	(Germany) GPS 7	1	16 December 2023		12	4	3	0
C-11	(Germany) GPS 8	1	3 January 2025		12	3	5	1

== Non-regulation finals buzzers ==
Below is a list of buzzers that have occurred on special episodes such as VS the World and All Stars seasons. In most cases, these stages represent the exact stages used during the main season, although they are typically untimed. These runs are based on the progression of a team, and therefore normal stage advancement rules are not applied, making them ineligible to be counted as regulation.

Prod No.	Season	Episodes	Start	Finish	Finalists	National Finals Results				
Prod No.	Season	Episodes	Start	Finish	Finalists	1st	2nd	3rd	Final	FD
V-1	(Singapore) SFO	1	28 November 2012		10	8	—	—	—	—
V-2	(United States) UVW 1	1	13 January 2014		10	4	2	0	—	—
V-3	(Vietnam) VAS 1	2	10 September 2015	17 September 2015	10	7	3	1	2	—
V-4	(United States) UVW 2	1	15 September 2014		15	3	4	4	—	2
V-5	(China) XIC 1	1	13 October 2015		10	7	7	3	—	—
V-6	(China) XIC 2	1	20 October 2015		10	6	8	4	—	2
V-7	(China) XIC 3	1	27 October 2015		10	6	5	1	—	—
V-8	(China) XIC 4	1	3 November 2015		10	10	9	4	—	—
V-9	(United States) UVW 3	1	31 January 2016		18	2	3	3	—	—
V-10	(United States) AAS 1	1	29 May 2016		10	—	3	—	—	2
V-11	(Vietnam) VAS 2	2	14 July 2016	21 July 2016	15	9	7	4	—	1
V-12	(United States) UVW 4	1	4 June 2017		18	3	3	2	—	—
V-13	(Vietnam) VTC 1	3	7 September 2017	21 September 2017	15	7	5	0	2	—
V-14	(United States) UVW 5	1	11 March 2018		16	4	2	0	—	2
V-15	(Germany) G4N 1	1	25 November 2018		24	1	1	1	—	2
V-16	(Vietnam) VAS 3	1	22 December 2018		12	—	—	—	1	—
V-17	(United States) UVW 6	1	27 January 2019		15	5	3	0	—	2
V-18	(Vietnam) VAS 4	2	29 July 2019	5 August 2019	16	12	—	—	—	2
V-19	(Germany) G4N 2	1	17 November 2019		24	6	7	0	—	2
V-20	(United States) UVW 7	1	26 January 2020		18	4	2	1	—	2
V-21	(Australia) ASO	1	16 August 2020		3	—	—	1	—	2
V-22	(Israel) IAS 1	2	22 March 2021	31 March 2021	12	8	0	—	—	—
V-23	(Germany) G4N 3	1	20 November 2022		28	6	5	3	—	1
V-24	(Israel) IBH	2	8 April 2023	12 April 2023	8	3	1	—	—	—
V-25	(France) LCDN	2	12 July 2024	19 July 2024	25	7	8	8	—	6
V-26	(Japan) SWC	1	21 August 2024		35	18	9	0	—	2
Franchise Total		34	Present		397	146	97	40	5	30

== Definitions ==
=== Finals Stage format ===
1st 1st Stage: The initial stage that all competitors appearing in the national finals will begin on. In Sasuke Vietnam, the 1st Stage course was split into part 1A and 1B, starting from the third obstacle to the final obstacle, so that this data combined all buzzers from both two-stage parts.

2nd 2nd Stage.

3rd 3rd Stage: This data has been normalized across international seasons, based on the presence of a mid-stage buzzer separating a timed Stage 2 from an untimed Stage 2B. It is very common in Europe to have the 2nd and 3rd Stage run back to back and referred to jointly as the 2nd Stage. In this case, the untimed section of the 2nd Stage will be classified as the 3rd Stage, as the format and obstacles exactly match those seen elsewhere.

Final Final Stage: The tower climb that appears as last round of competition. This will be the 4th Stage in all seasons unless otherwise noted.

FD Final Duel: In some series, the last round will feature an untimed final stage where multiple competitors race for the fastest time to be decide a champion. This has been seen in American Ninja Warrior seasons 12 and 17, Ninja Warrior Germany All Stars, Ninja Warrior UK season 6, Ninja Warrior Poland season 10, and Super Ninja.

=== Preliminary Stage format ===
1st Lite Always used as the first round of preliminary heats, 1st Lite Stage is a truncated versions of a normal stage 1 course that have appeared in every single preliminary round in ninja history. 1st Lite stages are almost always referred to as Heats or Qualifiers. A 1st Lite Stage contain between four and seven obstacles, and (outside of their initial appearance in Sasuke 13) represent the portion of a classic 1st Stage course from the starting line up to the Warped Wall, 2/3rds through the stage. However, the following series use the timed section of the 1st Lite Stages:

- Ninja Warrior: Le Parcours des héros season 5 and 6, where the first four obstacles of the heat had an exceptional long time limit.
- Ninja Warrior: Le Parcours des héros season 7, where the first two obstacles of the heat had an exceptional low time limit of 20 seconds (22 for women). However, time out at one of the first two obstacles did not result in an elimination, instead competitors lost the chance to attempt the Mega Wall.
- Ninja Israel season 4, where the first three obstacles of the heat had an exceptional low time limit of 30 to 40 seconds (50 for women).
- The original trials in Sasuke 13.

2nd Lite Appearing as the second preliminary round in more than two-thirds of ninja series, the 2nd Lite Stage features a modified version of the 2nd Stage. In seasons with two preliminary rounds, these are referred to as semifinals. In those with three preliminary rounds, they are referred to as Daily Finals. It is untimed, and features an initial slider or balance obstacle, followed a set of upper body and balance obstacles. In the majority of seasons, the hallmark of this stage is a Salmon Ladder followed by an imbalanced hanging obstacle such as Unstable Bridge. In nearly all cases, a 2nd Lite stage will end with a shortened tower climb; either a cargo net, rope climb Spider Climb, or Invisible Ladder.

In Ninja Warrior: Le Parcours des héros seasons 4–8, American Ninja Warrior 15–16, Ninja Warrior Polska season 10 and Ninja Warrior Germany All Stars, the 2nd Lite stage did not contain any Salmon Ladder, instead being a race between two competitors, with the best result within the pair advancing regardless of overall results.

1st EX Formally known as an "Extended Course", the Ext Stage appears as the second preliminary round in the USA, Denmark, Netherlands, UK, Sweden, Türkiye and Australia, and the third and fourth preliminary rounds in Hungary. This is an untimed course that is a combination of a 1st Lite Stage, immediately followed by a 2nd Lite stage with the first obstacle removed. In many cases, the Ext Stage's first six obstacles will exactly match the preceding 1st Lite heat, referred to as the "Front Half". The remaining three to four 2nd Lite obstacles are known as the "Back Half". In Ninja Warrior UK, the Front Half is timed and is called "Semifinal Stage 1" and features its own buzzer, with the Back Half called "Semifinal Stage 2".

α Another Stages, signified by a lowercase Alpha, are short three to four obstacle courses that are used after the completion of a stage in order to grant either an advantage, a prize, or as the losers brackets of a Double elimination round.

HSG Hashigo (梯子; lit. Ladder) is an extra round featured in Ninja Warrior Germany and Ninja Israel that consists of a super-sized Salmon Ladder of 20 to 40 rungs. It is used as an α Stage. Hashigo additionally appeared as the 3rd Stage in Ninja Warrior Germany All Stars

=== Advantages ===
Beginning in summer 2020, every series outside of Sasuke and Super Ninja added α Stages following the heat and semifinal rounds. A reduced number of competitors (usually 2 or 4) will race on a shortened stage, with the fastest overall earning an advantage to use during the competition. Initially, these races occurred almost exclusively on stages known as Power Towers, however this later branched out to short 3-4 obstacle courses, as well as the Hashigo challenge. In Ninja Warrior: Le Parcours des héros, advantages are granted based on the results of the semifinals course, with no α Stage.

Beginning in 2019, many series added a new, taller Warped Wall during preliminary rounds called the Mega Wall, where only one attempt was allowed, and a cash prize is earned for completion. In recent years, you must reach the Mega Wall under a certain time limit to be allowed any attempt. In Ninja Warrior: Le Parcours des héros, the Mega Wall has the additional power of guaranteeing the competitor an extra spot in the National Finals, in addition to normal advancement.

==== Speed Pass ====
This advantage allows the competitor to skip from the initial heats directly to the National Finals. In this case, competitors will still compete in the semifinal rounds for a chance to win additional rewards.

==== Golden Ticket ====
Similar to the Speed Pass, this advantage allows competitors to skip one (or in Ninja Warrior Polska season 10, two) preliminary rounds, with the competitor not appearing at all.

==== Safety Pass ====
This advantage allows the competitor a second run on either the 1st or 2nd Stage (or in American Ninja Warrior seasons 15–16, only the 1st Stage) if they fail or time out at any point. Competitors are given time to rest between their initial run and their Safety Pass run.

==== Joker ====
Similar to the Safety Pass, the Joker allows competitors a second try on either the 1st or 2nd Stage. Unlike the Safety Pass, Joker runs begin at the exact obstacle they failed, rather than from the beginning, and the time remaining on the clock is retained from their original run.

==== Guestlist ====
Exclusive to American Ninja Warrior season 12, competitors who win this guarantee their two groupmates a spot in the National Finals, even if they had not qualified.

==== Matchmaker ====
Exclusive to Australian Ninja Warrior season 6, this advantage allows competitors to break seeding rules and choose their opponent in their semifinals race.

==== Headstart ====
Exclusive to Australian Ninja Warrior season 4, this advantage awards competitors ten seconds during the semifinals before the timer begins, allowing them to potentially overtake an opponent if the leaderboard is close.

==== Wildcard ====
Wildcard is a rule on American Ninja Warrior that gives a chance for competitors who failed during city qualifiers or city finals, to have a final attempt on the Las Vegas national finals course.

Wildcard was also appeared in several seasons of Sasuke Vietnam, except it gives a chance for competitors who failed during 1st Stage, to have a final attempt on the 2nd Stage, due to Sasuke Vietnam featured only Finals course like Sasuke.
