= List of best results on Ninja Warrior =

This is a list of the best results on Ninja Warrior, which is a Japanese television franchise called Sasuke that was syndicated globally (e.g., American Ninja Warrior, Ninja Warrior Germany and Australian Ninja Warrior), and whose results are in chronological order.

== Definitions ==
=== Best result ===
Japanese: 最優秀選手, romanized: Saiyūshū Senshu

The competitor(s) who cleared the most obstacles in the season. Ties are not broken based on distance within an obstacle. The best female result is referred to as Josei Saiyūshū Senshu (女性最優秀選手).

=== Last Man Standing ===
The single competitor who was awarded the title of 'Last Man Standing' (LMS) for having the best overall performance. In VS competitions, these rules are used to determine the winner of each heat. Last Woman Standing (LWS) is used to indicate the best overall result for women in the same fashion. While this term has been used by fans for two decades, the first known usage within a televised Ninja Warrior series was in Ninja Warrior UK series 1 in 2015. All international versions use this rule, however Japan has no equivalent ruling. In the German and Swiss celebrity specials, the term was changed to Last Promi Standing (Last Celebrity Standing).

Determination is based on the following conditions, in order:

1. If the course was completed, fastest completion time.
2. Farthest obstacle reached.
3. Failure state (a timeout beats a failure).
4. If the stage is the Final Stage, time to reach the buzzer.
5. If the stage is the Final Stage, distance reached.
6. Time elapsed. This is generally the time in which the preceding obstacle was cleared, if the time is known.
7. If the obstacle is the first obstacle of the 3rd Stage in a European series with a combined 2nd/3rd Stage, the completion time of the prior stage is used.
8. If a discernable and meaningful difference in progress within the obstacle is possible, that will be used.
9. If the obstacle is the first obstacle of the 1st Stage, and not all runs were shown in full, no competitor will be considered Last Man Standing.
10. If the competitors failed at the same obstacle and the time is either unavailable or too close to call, it will be considered a tie.

Condition 8 has only been enacted once in franchise history, during Stage 3 Heat 2 in X Warrior: International Competition - China vs Singapore.

Condition 9 has only been enacted once in franchise history, to determine LWS in Sasuke 25, when all women failed at the first obstacle with one run digested, and the other three fully cut.

Condition 10 has been enacted in four occasions, to determine LMS during Sasuke 18, Sasuke 19, Sasuke 25 and Sasuke 28.

=== Final contender ===
Japanese: 最終競技者, romanized: Saishū Kyōgi-sha

The competitor who was shown running last during the broadcast, regardless of if they earned Best Result. This definition is only used within Japan, and has erroneously been referred to as Last Man Standing in English speaking communities due to mistranslations. However, the Final Contender did not achieve Best Result in 6 cases.

=== Total victory ===
Japanese: 完全制覇, romanized: Kanzenseiha

The competitor(s) who cleared all stages under the traditional Survival Attack rules:

1. The competitor does not fall into the water (Retire).
2. Any timed stages (generally the 1st, 2nd and Final) are completed within their designated time limits (Time Out).
3. Any untimed stages (generally the 3rd) are completed with each rest area's time limit not elapsing. While this rule exists, it has never resulted in an elimination.
4. The competitor does not step off the course or grab a support structure (Course Out).
5. The competitor does not break any pre-established rules (Disqualification).
6. Stages must be completed in consecutive order with a single regulation season. It is not possible to achieve Total Victory in a special event such as an international team competition.
7. The format of the show does not guarantee a winner.
8. If multiple individuals win, they are both considered as having achieved Total Victory.
9. If a maximum number of advancers is specified, a competitor may be eliminated despite clearing a stage.

The following exceptions apply to the above rules:

1. Competitors may complete a Repechage stage to negate their failure (seen in Kunoichi 8, Ninja Warrior France seasons 7–8, and American Ninja Warrior seasons 15–16)
2. Competitors may re-attempt a failed course if a referee certifies a technical problem with the course, or a lack of communication in the rules . The may be initiated by the competitor as in Sasuke 23, or by the referee themselves as in Super Ninja 3
3. Competitors may re-attempt the 1st or 2nd Stage from the start if they earned a Safety Pass advantage during preliminary rounds. This has been present in American Ninja Warrior seasons 11,13–16 and Australian Ninja Warrior seasons 4–6.
4. Competitors may re-attempt the 1st or 2nd Stage from the obstacle they failed, retaining the time they had on the clock, if they earned a Joker advantage during preliminary rounds. This has been present in Ninja Warrior France 5–8
5. Competitors may advance to the 2nd Stage even if they failed at the 1st Stage if the season has a specified minimum number of advancers. This was enacted in American Ninja Warrior seasons 12 and 15.
6. Competitors may advance to the 2nd Stage even if they failed at the 1st Stage if they are awarded the Special Competitor advantage. This was awarded to women in Sasuke Vietnam season 4.

=== Champion ===
The sole competitor who was declared Last Man Standing in any season that guarantees a winner through an untimed final.

=== Daily victory ===
German: Tagessieger

While variations of the term exist in several international adaptations of Ninja Warrior, the terms originating from a German term to describe the winner of an individual round or match within a larger competition. Daily Victory is the competitor(s) who cleared all stages of a course, outside of a main tournament, and is the equivalent of Last Man Standing for special events. This can also be applied to any special event, preliminary qualifying heat or semifinal where there is no guaranteed Champion. This has been seen in Sasuke: X Warrior, Sasuke Malaysia, Sasuke Singapore, and the celebrity specials of Ninja Warrior Germany and Ninja Warrior Switzerland.

== List of best results (individual seasons) ==
All results are taken from their respective broadcasts. Season acronyms are based on the abbreviations seen here. All competitors are assumed to be the nationality of the corresponding show except where indicated with a flag.

† Indicates that the competitor was not named the season winner, but would have been under normal Last Man Standing Rules (Limited to Japan).
‡ LMS exceptions: indicates the competitor who was declared winner of the season did not achieve Last Man Standing. In very rare cases the winner of the season also did not achieve Best Result.
⸸ Indicates that there is no consensus on Last Man Standing and results are too close to call, and so Last Man Standing is considered to be tied.
♀ Indicates a female competitor.
Indicates a competitor who was declared Last Man Standing during broadcast, but had the result overturned.

The Season Winner is the competitor who was Last Man Standing, Champion, or Daily Victory, except in Japan where it is the Final Contender.

Season	Division	Stage	Obstacle	Best Result(s)					
Season	Division	Stage	Obstacle	Last Ninja Standing	Num.	Achieved by (in addition to LNS)			
(Egypt) NWBA		2nd	Unstable Bridge	(Morocco) Nasr Eddine Aboudi	2	(Egypt) Mahmoud Adel Zeidan			
(Australia) AuNW 1		2nd	Unstable Bridge	Fred Dorrington	2	Tom O'Halloran			
(Australia) AuNW 2		2nd	Unstable Bridge	Rob Patterson	3	Alex Bigg		Bryson Klein	
(Australia) AuNW 3		3rd	Floating Doors	Charlie Robbins	3	Bryson Klein		Daniel Mason	
(Australia) AuNW 4		Final	Total Victory	Ben Polson	3	Charlie Robbins		Zak Stolz	
(Australia) AuNW 5		3rd	Doorknob Drop	Zak Stolz	1				
(Australia) AuNW 6		3rd	The Dungeon	Zak Stolz	1				
(Austria) NWAT 1		3rd	Cliffhanger	Nicky de Leeuw	1				
(Austria) NWAT 2		3rd	Flying Bar	Nicky de Leeuw	1				
(Austria) NWAT 3		Final	Total Victory	(Switzerland) Joel Mattli	1				
(China) SXW		1st	Daily Victory	Haibin Qu	9	Yiqi Li	Yujie Liu	Chengyu Shang	Sheng Wei
(China) SXW		1st	Daily Victory	Haibin Qu	9	Xiangji Zeng	Jianhui Ji	Meng Fan	Wenlong Li
(Denmark) DNW		3rd	Ultimate Cliffhanger	Bjarke Tønnesen	2	Rasmus Blaabjerg (Note: The original broadcast named Rasmus Blaabjerg as the winner, however TBS overturned this ruling when awarding the prize of a sport in American Ninja Warrior: USA Vs the World 2017.)			
(France) LPDH 1		3rd	Flying Bar	Valentin Dubois	1				
(France) LPDH 2		Final	Rope Climb	Thomas Ballet	1				
(France) LPDH 3		3rd	Flying Bar	Jean Tezenas du Montcel	1				
(France) LPDH 4		Final	Total Victory	Jean Tezenas du Montcel	2	Nicolas Cerquant			
(France) LPDH 5		Final	Rope Climb	Jean Tezenas du Montcel	1				
(France) LPDH 6		Final	Total Victory	Clement Gravier	2	Iliann Cherif			
(France) LPDH 7		Final	Rope Climb	Charles Poujade	5	Iliann Cherif	Clement Gravier	Antoine Gravier	Clement Dumais
(France) LPDH 8		Final	Total Victory	Matthias Noirel	2	Clement Gravier			
(France) LPDH 9		Final	Total Victory	(Germany) Rene Casselly	1				
(Germany) NWG 1		2nd	Unstable Bridge	Oliver Edelmann	1				
(Germany) NWG 2		3rd	Cliffhanger	Moritz Hans	2	Rene Casselly			
(Germany) NWG 3		Final	Rope Climb	Alexander Wurm	1				
(Germany) NWG 4		3rd	Flying Bar	Alexander Wurm	2	Moritz Hans			
(Germany) NWG 5		3rd	Flying Bar	Alexander Wurm	2	Kim Marschner			
(Germany) NWG 6		Final	Total Victory	Rene Casselly	2	Moritz Hans			
(Germany) NWG 7		Final	Salmon Ladder Judan	Max Görner	2	Moritz Hans			
(Germany) NWG 8		Final	Rope Climb	Philipp Göthert	1				
(Germany) NWG 9		Final	Rope Climb	Rene Casselly	2	Moritz Hans			
(Germany) NWG 10		Final	Salmon Ladder Sanjudan	Philipp Göthert	1				
(Germany) GAS 1		Final	Champion	Kim Marschner	1				
(Germany) GAS 2		Final	Champion	Lukas Kilian	1				
(Germany) GKI 1	Ages 10–11	Final	Champion	Luca♀	1				
(Germany) GKI 1	Ages 12–13	Final	Champion	Frederik Huber	1				
(Germany) GKI 2	Ages 10–13	Final	Champion	Lotta Kokemohr♀	1				
(Germany) GPS 1		Final	Daily Victory	(United States) Isaac Caldiero	1				
(Germany) GPS 2		Final	Daily Victory	(United States) Grant McCartney	2	Philipp Boy			
(Germany) GPS 3		Final	Daily Victory	(United States) Jamie Rahn	3	Philipp Boy		Fabian Hambüchen	
(Germany) GPS 4		Final	Rope Climb	Martin Schmitt	2	(Switzerland) Luca Hänni			
(Germany) GPS 5		Final	Daily Victory	Martin Schmitt	2	Sven Hannawald			
(Germany) GPS 6		Final	Salmon Ladder	(Switzerland) Luca Hänni	3	Martin Schmitt		Sven Hannawald	
(Germany) GPS 7		Final	Salmon Ladder	Adriano Salvaggio	2	(Switzerland) Luca Hänni			
(Germany) GPS 8		Final	Daily Victory	Marcel Nguyen	1				
(Hungary) NWH 1		3rd	Cliffhanger	Máté Gyömrei	1				
(Hungary) NWH 2		3rd	Flying Bar	Soma Strommer	1				
(Hungary) NWH 3		Final	Rope Climb	Chris Harmat	2	Máté Gyömrei			
(Indonesia) SNWI 1		Final	Rope Climb	Angga Cahya	3	Muhammad Luky		Putra Waluya	
(Indonesia) SNWI 2		Final	Rope Climb	Yosua Laskaman Zalukhu	1				
(Indonesia) IOM 1		Final	Rope Climb	Jajang Wildan	1				
(Indonesia) IOM 2		2nd	Salmon Ladder	Erlando	1				
(Indonesia) ISP		2nd	Floating Boards	Herman Syahputra	1				
(Indonesia) IIC		3rd	Flying Bar	(Spain) Sergio Verdasco	9	(Japan) Ryo Matachi	(Japan) Shunsuke Nagasaki	(Netherlands) Perry Oosterlee	(Japan) Yusuke Morimoto
(Indonesia) IIC		3rd	Flying Bar	(Spain) Sergio Verdasco	9	(United States) Daniel Gil	(United States) Jake Murray	Tri Mardyanto	(United States) Drew Drechsel
(Israel) NIL 1		Final	Rope Climb	Yuval Shemla	1				
(Israel) NIL 2		3rd	Floating Boards	Gil Marantz	1				
(Israel) NIL 3		3rd	Flying Bar	Yuval Shemla	2	Alex Khazanov			
(Israel) NIL 4		Final	Total Victory	Yuval Shemla	2	Yogev Malka			
(Israel) NIL 5		Final	Total Victory	Yogev Malka	2	Shneor Sameach			
(Israel) NIC	Ages 9–13	2nd	Total Victory	Geva Levin	1				
(Israel) IAS 2		2nd	Champion	Alex Khazanov	1				
(Italy) NWIT		3rd	Floating Boards	Riccardo Piazza	1				
(Japan) SSK 1		Final	Rope Climb	Akira Omori	4	Takashi Yo	Ken Hasegawa	Takayuki Kawashima	
(Japan) SSK 2		Final	Rope Climb	Hikaru Tanaka†	2	Akira Omori‡			
(Japan) SSK 3		Final	Rope Climb	Katsumi Yamada†	5	Minoru Matsumoto	Tatsuya Yamamoto	Akira Omori‡	Shingo Yamamoto
(Japan) SSK 4		Final	Total Victory	Kazuhiko Akiyama	1				
(Japan) SSK 5		3rd	Pipe Slider	Shingo Yamamoto	1				
(Japan) SSK 6		3rd	Pipe Slider	Katsumi Yamada	1				
(Japan) SSK 7		Final	Spider Climb	Shingo Yamamoto	1				
(Japan) SSK 8		Final	Rope Climb	Kane Kosugi	1				
(Japan) SSK 9		3rd	Pipe Slider	Makoto Nagano	1				
(Japan) SSK 10		3rd	Pipe Slider	Katsumi Yamada	1				
(Japan) SSK 11		Final	Rope Climb	Makoto Nagano	1				
(Japan) SSK 12		Final	Rope Climb	Makoto Nagano	3	Bunpei Shiratori		Hiroyuki Asaoka	
(Japan) SSK 13		Final	Rope Climb	Makoto Nagano	1				
(Japan) SSK 14		3rd	Devil Balanço	Shinji Kobayashi†	1				
(Japan) SSK 15		3rd	Devil Balanço	Toshihiro Takeda	1				
(Japan) SSK 16		3rd	Pipe Slider	Bunpei Shiratori†	2	Koji Yamada			
(Japan) SSK 17		Final	Total Victory	Makoto Nagano	1				
(Japan) SSK 18		3rd	Shin Cliffhanger	Tie (3-way)	3	Shunsuke Nagasaki⸸	Makoto Nagano⸸	Kenji Takahashi⸸	
(Japan) SSK 19		2nd	Salmon Ladder	Tie (2-way)	2	Koji Yamada⸸		Yuji Washimi⸸	
(Japan) SSK 20		3rd	Shin Cliffhanger	Levi Meeuwenberg	1				
(Japan) SSK 21		3rd	Gliding Ring	Makoto Nagano	1				
(Japan) SSK 22		Final	G-Rope	Yuuji Urushihara	1				
(Japan) SSK 23		Final	G-Rope	Makoto Nagano	2	Hitoshi Kanno			
(Japan) SSK 24		Final	Total Victory	Yuuji Urushihara	1				
(Japan) SSK 25		3rd	Ultimate Cliffhanger	Tie (2-way)	4	Koji Hashimoto⸸	Lee En-Chih⸸	Yoshiyuki Okuyama	Kenji Takahashi
(Japan) SSK 26		3rd	Ultimate Cliffhanger	Yoshiyuki Okuyama	4	(United States) David Campbell	(United States) Brent Steffensen	Lee En-Chih	
(Japan) SSK 27		Final	Total Victory	Yuuji Urushihara	1				
(Japan) SSK 28		3rd	Crazy Cliffhanger	Tie (2-way)	3	Yuuji Urushihara⸸	Hitoshi Kanno⸸	Kazuma Asa	
(Japan) SSK 29		3rd	Pipe Slider	Yusuke Morimoto†	1				
(Japan) SSK 30		Final	Rope Climb	Ryo Matachi	2	Tomohiro Kawaguchi			
(Japan) SSK 31		Final	Total Victory	Yusuke Morimoto	1				
(Japan) SSK 32		3rd	Vertical Limit Kai	(United States) Drew Drechsel†	1				
(Japan) SSK 33		3rd	Ultra Crazy Cliffhanger	(United States) Drew Drechsel†	1				
(Japan) SSK 34		3rd	Vertical Limit Kai	Yusuke Morimoto	1				
(Japan) SSK 35		Final	Rope Climb	Yusuke Morimoto	1				
(Japan) SSK 36		Final	Rope Climb	Yusuke Morimoto	1				
(Japan) SSK 37		Final	Salmon Ladder Jugodan	(Germany) Rene Casselly	2	Tatsuya Tada			
(Japan) SSK 38		Final	Total Victory	Yusuke Morimoto	1				
(Japan) SSK 39		3rd	Vertical Limit Kai	Tatsuya Tada	1				
(Japan) SSK 40		Final	Rope Climb	Yusuke Morimoto	2	Yoshiyuki Yamamoto			
(Japan) SSK 41		3rd	Vertical Limit.BURST	Tie (3-way)	4	Ryosuke Miyaoka⸸	Yusuke Morimoto⸸	Keitaro Yamamoto⸸	Tatsuya Tada
(Japan) SSK 42		Final	Rope Climb	Ryosuke Miyaoka	1				
(Japan) SSK 43		Final	Rope Climb	Yusuke Morimoto	1				
(Japan) KNI 1	Women	2nd	Super Jump	Masami Yusa♀	2	Miho Yamada♀			
(Japan) KNI 2	Women	Final	Skyway Crossing	Yuko Mizuno♀†	2	Kazue Watanabe♀‡			
(Japan) KNI 3	Women	Final	Skyway Pole	Yuko Mizuno♀	3	Tomomi Hanzawa♀		Mika Izumi♀	
(Japan) KNI 4	Women	Final	Total Victory	Ayako Miyake♀	1				
(Japan) KNI 5	Women	Final	Total Victory	Ayako Miyake♀	1				
(Japan) KNI 6	Women	Final	Total Victory	Ayako Miyake♀	1				
(Japan) KNI 7	Women	3rd	Domino Hill	Maho Tanaka♀	1				
(Japan) KNI 8	Women	Final	Total Victory	Satomi Kadoi♀	2	Rie Komiya♀			
(Japan) KNI 9	Women	Final	Rope Climb	Hikari Izumi♀	1				
(Japan) KNI 10	Women	3rd	Pipe Slider	Hikari Izumi♀	2	Kana Watanabe♀			
(Japan) KNI 11	Women	Final	Rope Climb	Sakiko Okabe♀	1				
(Japan) KNI 12	Women	Final	Total Victory	Ayano Oshima♀	1				
(Japan) KNI 13	Women	Final	Salmon Ladder	Ayano Oshima♀	2	Mai Watanabe♀			
(Japan) PPS 1		2nd	Car Pull	Yoshinobu Nakano	2	Kazuyuki Muto			
(Japan) PPS 2		2nd	Barbell Crank	Beef Sasaki	2	Takashi Kawakami			
(Japan) SJR 1	Ages 8–12	2nd	Cylinder Climb	Unknown	2	Shota Oka		Tsuyoshi Osawa	
(Japan) SJR 2	Ages 8–12	Final	Pole Climb	Ryoji Hanazuka	1				
(Japan) SJR 3	Ages 8–12	Final	Pole Climb	Jun Hirayama	2	Shogo Suzuki			
(Japan) SJR 4	Ages 8–12	3rd	Parallel Bars	Yukihiro Kikuchi	1				
(Japan) SJR 5	Ages 8–12	Final	Total Victory	Kazuki Kudo	2	Naoshi Hasegawa (Note: Naoshi Hasegawa would normal be considered Last Man Standing for having been the last person to clear the Final Stage, however the narration of the episode indicated that the segments were shown out of order, and that Kazuki Kudo was Last man Standing.)			
(Japan) SJR 6	Ages 8–12	1st	Champion	Katsuya Nishioka	5	Tatsuya Inami	Yoshiyuki Shimazaki	Takeharu Shinmura	Unknown
(Japan) SJC	Ages 10–12	Final	Champion	Koshi Endo	1				
(Japan) SSR	Ages 50+	1st	Net Bridge	Masato Maruyama	1				
(Japan) HNZ	Men	Final	Champion	Shimizu Seigo	1				
(Japan) HNZ	Women	Final	Champion	Ayano Oshima	1				
(Malaysia) SMY 1		2nd	Daily Victory	Mohammed Farid Isham	4	Sufian	Mohammed Kaldon	Amir Hamzah	
(Malaysia) SMY 2		1st	Daily Victory	Mohammed Farid Isham	5	Amirul Ashraf	Jonathan Hwa	Mohammed Sofian	Nik Saiful
(Mongolia) MNWS		3rd	Pipe Slider	Batbaatar Battur	4	E. Choynyam	T. Ankhbayar	T. Och	
(Netherlands) NWNL		3rd	Flying Bar	Perry Oosterlee	1				
(Poland) NWP 1		3rd	Floating Boards	Jakub Zawistowski	1				
(Poland) NWP 2		3rd	Hang Climbing	Robert Bandosz	1				
(Poland) NWP 3		3rd	Hang Climbing	Sebastian Kasprzyk	1				
(Poland) NWP 4		Final	Rope Climb	Igor Fojcik	1				
(Poland) NWP 5		3rd	Flying Bar	Igor Fojcik	1				
(Poland) NWP 6		3rd	Window Hang	Paweł Murawski	3	Hubert Przytuła		Grzegorz Niecko	
(Poland) NWP 7		Final	Rope Climb	Jan Tatarowicz	2	Grzegorz Niecko			
(Poland) NWP 8		Final	Rope Climb	Damian Drzewiecki	4	Grzegorz Niecko	Mariusz Bulandra	Michał Grochoła	
(Poland) NWP 9		Final	Total Victory	Jan Tatarowicz	1				
(Poland) NWP 10		Final	Champion	Jan Tatarowicz	1				
(Poland) NWP 11		Final	Champion	(France) Clement Gravier	1				
(Poland) NWP 12		Final	Champion	Jan Tatarowicz	1				
(Romania) NWRO		2nd	Unstable Bridge	George Maris	3	Emmanuel Lutz		Marius Carcuin	
(Russia) RNNW 1		3rd	Flying Bar	Sergei Luzhetsky	1				
(Russia) RNNW 2		3rd	Cliffhanger	Vitaliy Potapov	1				
(Russia) RNNW 3		3rd	Spinball Wizard	Stanislav Kokorin	1				
(Russia) SUN 1		Final	Champion	Yuri Prokudin	1				
(Russia) SUN 2		Final	Champion	Vadim Timonov	1				
(Russia) SUN 3		Final	Champion	(Germany) Ole Janek	1				
(Russia) SUN 4		Final	Champion	Yuri Prokudin	1				
(Russia) SNK 1	Ages 9–10	Final	Champion	Valery Shubin	1				
(Russia) SNK 1	Ages 11–12	Final	Champion	Philipp Molyakov	1				
(Russia) SNK 1	Ages 13–14	1st	Champion	Kira Chizhkova♀	1				
(Singapore) SSG 1		2nd	Daily Victory	Isaiah How	15	Kelvin Ang	Syaiful Irfan	Mohammed Hafiz	Adriel Choo
(Singapore) SSG 1		2nd	Daily Victory	Isaiah How	15	Roger Marsh	Noor Andika	Jasper Chua	Noel Ong
(Singapore) SSG 1		2nd	Daily Victory	Isaiah How	15	Bernard Ging	Koh Chen Pin	Mohammed Iffan	Rifdi Abdullah
(Singapore) SSG 1		2nd	Daily Victory	Isaiah How	15	Jenson Ngoh		Bernard Chiew	
(Singapore) SSG 2		2nd	Daily Victory	Alan Zhang	11	Augustine Pang	Liang Qinlong	Shaik Amirudin	Mohamad Sarhan
(Singapore) SSG 2		2nd	Daily Victory	Alan Zhang	11	Seet Qinhong	Khairuddin Bin Abdul Razak	Kirk Patrick	Ahmad Faizal
(Singapore) SSG 2		2nd	Daily Victory	Alan Zhang	11	Alvin Tan		Andrew Lim	
(Spain) NWES 1		3rd	Flying Bar	Sergio Verdasco	3	Iris Matamoros		Eric Lopez	
(Spain) NWES 2		Final	Rope Climb	Eric Lopez	1				
(Sweden) NWSV 1		3rd	Cliffhanger	Alexander Mars	1				
(Sweden) NWSV 2		3rd	Cliffhanger	Andre Sihm	2	David Johansson			
(Switzerland) NWSW 1		3rd	Floating Boards	Simon Weiss	5	Dominique Karlin	Warren Verboom	Michael Rindisbacher	Moritz Alder
(Switzerland) NWSW 2		3rd	Flying Bar	Marco Muller	1				
(Switzerland) SWPS 1		Final	Daily Victory	(Germany) Moritz Hans	1				
(Switzerland) SWPS 2		Final	Daily Victory	Dave Dollé	1				
(Switzerland) SWPS 3		Final	Daily Victory	Fabien Rohrer	1				
(Turkey) NWTU 1		3rd	Floating Boards	Ertuğrul Tatar	3	Ömer Günyaz		Burak Abdullah Soytürk	
(Turkey) NWTU 2		3rd	Floating Boards	Ferdi Karakurt	1				
(United Kingdom) NWUK 1		2nd	Wall Lift	Tim Shieff	1				
(United Kingdom) NWUK 2		2nd	Unstable Bridge	Owen McKenzie	1				
(United Kingdom) NWUK 3		3rd	Crazy Cliffhanger	Jonny Urszuly	2	Cain Clarke			
(United Kingdom) NWUK 4		3rd	Flying Bar	Tim Shieff	2	Deren Perez			
(United Kingdom) NWUK 5		Final	Total Victory	Tim Champion	1				
(United Kingdom) NWUK 6	Men	2nd	Champion	(Australia) Fred Dorrington	1				
(United Kingdom) NWUK 6	Women	2nd	Champion	Beth Lodge♀	1				
(United States) ANC 1		1st	Jumping Spider	Colin Bell	2	Brett Sims			
(United States) ANC 2		3rd	Shin Cliffhanger	Levi Meeuwenberg	1				
(United States) ANC 3		2nd	Salmon Ladder	Levi Meeuwenberg	2	Brian Orosco			
(United States) ANC 4		1st	Rope Ladder	David Campbell	1				
(United States) ANW 1		3rd	Shin Cliffhanger	Levi Meeuwenberg	1				
(United States) ANW 2		3rd	Ultimate Cliffhanger	David Campbell	2	Brent Steffensen			
(United States) ANW 3		3rd	Ultimate Cliffhanger	David Campbell	4	Ryan Stratis	Paul Kasemir	James McGrath	
(United States) ANW 4		3rd	Hang Climb	Brent Steffensen	1				
(United States) ANW 5		3rd	Flying Bar	Brian Arnold	1				
(United States) ANW 6		3rd	Hang Climb	Joe Moravsky	1				
(United States) ANW 7		Final	Total Victory	Isaac Caldiero	2	Geoff Britten			
(United States) ANW 8		3rd	Hang Climb	Drew Drechsel	1				
(United States) ANW 9		3rd	Time Bomb	Joe Moravsky	1				
(United States) ANW 10		3rd	Ultimate Cliffhanger	Drew Drechsel	2	Sean Bryan			
(United States) ANW 11		Final	Total Victory	Drew Drechsel	1				
(United States) ANW 12		Final	Champion	Daniel Gil	1				
(United States) ANW 13		Final	Rope Climb	Kaden Lebsack	1				
(United States) ANW 14		Final	Rope Climb	Kaden Lebsack	5	Jay Lewis	Josiah Pippel	R.J. Roman	Josh Levin
(United States) ANW 15		Final	Total Victory	Vance Walker	2	Daniel Gil			
(United States) ANW 16		Final	Total Victory	Vance Walker	2	Caleb Bergstrom			
(United States) ANW 17		Knockout	Champion	Kai Beckstrand	1				
(United States) ANW 18									
(United States) AWC 1	Women	Final	Champion	Meagen Martin	1				
(United States) AWC 2	Women	Final	Champion	Jesse Labreck	1				
(United States) AWC 3	Women	Final	Champion	Katie Bone	1				
(United States) AWC 4	Women	Final	Champion	Addy Herman	1				
(United States) AJR 1	Ages 9–10	Final	Champion	Collin Cella	1				
(United States) AJR 1	Ages 11–12	Final	Champion	Kai Beckstrand	1				
(United States) AJR 1	Ages 13–14	Final	Champion	Vance Walker	1				
(United States) AJR 2	Ages 9–10	Final	Champion	Nathanael Honvou	1				
(United States) AJR 2	Ages 11–12	Final	Champion	Jack David	1				
(United States) AJR 2	Ages 13–14	Final	Champion	Vance Walker	1				
(United States) AJR 3	Ages 9–10	Final	Champion	Max Salebra	1				
(United States) AJR 3	Ages 11–12	Final	Champion	Bella Palmer♀	1				
(United States) AJR 3	Ages 13–14	Final	Champion	Jackson Erdos	1				
(Vietnam) SVN 1		3rd	Pipe Slider	Lê Văn Thực	1				
(Vietnam) SVN 2		Final	Total Victory	Lê Văn Thực	3	(United States) David Campbell		Nguyễn Phước Huynh	
(Vietnam) SVN 3		3rd	Crazy Cliffhanger	(Malaysia) Mat Redho	1				
(Vietnam) SVN 4		3rd	Crazy Cliffhanger	(Malaysia) Mat Redho	3	Đỗ Văn Quang		Nguyễn Doãn Thọ	
(Vietnam) SVN 5		3rd	Spider Flip	Trần Minh Khương	2	Nguyễn Minh Tuấn			
(Vietnam) SVN 6									

== List of best results (team competitions) ==
Season	Division	Winning Team	Team Members					
Season	Division	Winning Team	Captain	Teammates				
(Australia) ASO		Western Australia	Ben Polson	Zed Colback		Sam Goodall		Olivia Vivian♀
(Denmark) TNWD		Søpapegøje	(Faroe Islands) Øssur Eiriksfoss	(Faroe Islands) Janus Jakobsen		(Faroe Islands) Birita Poulsen♀		
(Germany) TNWG 1		Magic Monkeys	René Casselly	Simon Brunner		Dense Pirnbacher♀		
(Germany) TNWG 2		Magic Monkeys	René Casselly	Simon Brunner		(Austria) Steffanie Edelmann♀		
(Germany) TGPS	Celebrity	Sporthelden	Philipp Boy	Björn Otto		Tanja Szewczenko♀		
(Germany) GPS 7		Team Wonti	Adriano Salvaggio	Sven Hannawald		Mimi Kraus		Angela Finger-Erben♀
(Germany) GPS 8		Team Buschi	Marcel Nguyen	Martin Schmitt		Mike Heiter		Christine Theiss♀
(Israel) IAS 1		Team Ben Yosef	Yossi Ben Yosef	Sol Bocian		Amor Paz♀		
(Israel) IBH		The Raskings	Yogev Malka	Ishay Halfon	Yehonatan Haran	Eyal Haiman	Adi Kerem♀	Sharon Barenboim♀
(United States) AAS 1		Team Akbar	Flip Rodriguez	Brent Steffensen	Jamie Rahn	Daniel Gil		Meagan Martin♀
(United States) AAS 2		Team Kristine	Flip Rodriguez	Nicholas Coolidge		Jessie Graff♀		
(United States) AAS 3		Team Kristine	Flip Rodriguez	J.J. Woods		Jessie Graff♀		
(United States) AAS 4		Team Matt	Jamie Rahn	Lance Pekus		Jesse Labreck♀		
(United States) AFC	Family	Auer Family	Caleb Auer	Josh Auer		Hannah Auer♀		
(United States) ACC 1	Couples			Kyle Soderman		Megan Johnson		
(United States) ACC 2	Couples			Sam Folsom		Isabella Folsom		
(United States) NVN 1		Party Time	Brian Arnold	Jake Murray		Jennifer Tavernier♀		
(United States) NVCM	Ages 18–23	University of Wisconsin	Zack Kemmerer	Andrew Philibeck		Taylor Amann♀		
(United States) NVN 2		Storm Team	Joe Moravsky	Josh Levin		Allyssa Beird♀		
(United States) NVN 3		Labreckfast Club	Jesse Labreck♀	Jon Alexis Jr.		Chris DiGangi		
(Vietnam) VCT 1		Green	Bản Văn Chu	Quang Văn Đỗ	Trường Nhật Nguyễn	Hạnh Huy Nguyễn		Bùi Xuân Nguyên

== List of best results (international competitions) ==
For preliminary rounds that determine advancement and seeding, placement is shown. For the final round of competition and for tiebreakers, the score is shown.

Season	Winning Team	Scores by Round				Team Members						
Season	Winning Team	1st	2nd	3rd	4th	Captain	Teammates					
(China) XIC 1	China	4–2	—	—	—	Haibin Qu	Bin Xie	Bin Fang	Yan Han		Yiqi Li	
(China) XIC 2	United Kingdom	3–3	1–0	—	—	Toby Segar	Steve Jehu	Teige Matthews-Palmer	Richard Bartlett		Tim Champion	
(China) XIC 3	China	6–0	—	—	—	Lin Wang	Bin Fang	Yancheng Den	Tongxing Li		Bin Xie	
(China) XIC 4	China	4–2	—	—	—	Bin Xie	Haibin Qu	Bin Fang	Yan Han		Yiqi Li	
(France) LCDN	France	2nd	2nd	1st	5–3–1	Jean Tezenas	Clément Gravier	Iliann Cherif	Charles Poujade		Maruane Jelic♀	
(Germany) G4N 1	Germany	1st	1–0	—	—	Moritz Hans	Alexander Wurm	Oliver Edelmann	Benjamin Grams		René Casselly	Max Sprenger
(Germany) G4N 2	United States	1st	1–0	—	—	Drew Drechsel	Flip Rodrguez	Isaac Caldiero	Niel Craver		Jamie Rahn	Jessie Graff♀
(Germany) G4N 3	United States	2nd	1–0	—	—	Austin Grey	R.J. Roman	Lance Pekus	Chris DiGangi	Jay Lewis	Barclay Stockett♀	Jesse Labreck♀
(Indonesia) IIC	(European Union) Europe	3rd	2nd	1st	—	(Netherlands) Perry Oosterlee	(Spain) Sergio Verdasco	(Germany) Oliver Edelmann	(Sweden) André Sihm		(United Kingdom) Dion Trigg	
(Japan) SWC	Japan RED	1st	1st	1st	1–0	Yusuke Morimoto	Tatsuya Tada	Keitaro Yamamoto	Yoshiyuki Yamamoto		Ayano Oshima♀	
(Singapore) SFO	Singapore	3–2	—	—	—	Rifdi Abdullah	Jenson Ngoh	Jasper Chua	Kelvin Ang		Syaiful Irfan	
(United States) UVW 1	United States	6–0	—	—	—	Paul Kasemir	Brent Steffensen	James McGrath	Travis Rosen		Brian Arnold	
(United States) UVW 2	(European Union) Europe	9–9	1–0	—	—	(United Kingdom) Tim Shieff	(Canada) Sean McColl	(Italy) Stefano Ghisolfi	(Finland) Miska Sutela		(Ukraine) Vadym Kuvakin	
(United States) UVW 3	United States	10–8–0	—	—	—	Isaac Caldiero	Kevin Bull	Joe Moravsky	Geoff Britten		Drew Drechsel	Ian Dory
(United States) UVW 4	United States	10–7–1	—	—	—	Drew Drechsel	Daniel Gil	Brian Arnold	Jake Murray		Josh Levin	Jessie Graff♀
(United States) UVW 5	(European Union) Europe	2nd	1st	1–0	—	(Canada) Sean McColl	(Sweden) Alexander Mars		(Faroe Islands) Øssur Eiriksfoss		(Spain) Sergio Verdasco	
(United States) UVW 6	United States	1st	1–0	—	—	Drew Drechsel	Mathis Owhadi	Najee Richardson	Barclay Stockett♀		Jesse Labreck♀	
(United States) UVW 7	Australia	2nd	1–0	—	—	Bryson Klein	Daniel Mason	Josh O'Sullivan	Cam D'Silva		Matt Tsang	Olivia Vivian♀
(Vietnam) VAS 1	(United Nations) International	3–3	1–0	—	—	(Japan) Ryo Matachi	(Japan) Dai Yamashita	(Japan) Minoru Kubota	(Ukraine) Vu Artem		(Bulgaria) Daniel Denev	
(Vietnam) VAS 2	Vietnam	10–5–3	—	—	—	Thực Văn Lê	Huynh Phước Nguyễn	Mạnh Trí Vũ	Anh Văn Trần		Dũng Việt Nguyễn	
(Vietnam) VAS 3	Vietnam 2	1st	1–0	—	—	Mạnh Đình Đào	Vũ Văn Nguyễn		Khương Minh Trần			
(Vietnam) VAS 4	(Vietnam) Fire	3rd	1st	1–0	—	Quang Văn Đỗ	Khánh Ngọc Trần		Thọ Doãn Nguyễn		Khương Minh Trần	

== List of best female results (individual seasons) ==
Outside of women's only seasons such as Kunoichi, American Ninja Warrior Women's Championship, Junior series and the women's division of Ninja Warriorr UK: Race for Glory, women have not achieved a Best Result on any ninja series. As a result, many series have opted to separately award a Last Woman Standing to recognize the best female achievements on ninja series. Below is a list of all Last Women Standing and Best Female Results for series where a woman was not already Last Ninja Standing or Best Result.

Indonesia's Spesial Polri, Indonesia's International Competition, Pancratium, Sasuke Senior, American Ninja Challenge seasons 1 and 2 are not listed as no women competed in those season.

All results are taken from their respective broadcasts.

Season	Division	Stage	Obstacle	Female Best Result(s)					
Season	Division	Stage	Obstacle	Last Woman Standing	Num.	Achieved by (in addition to LWS)			
(Egypt) NWBA		1st	Warped Wall	Basant Hashim	1				
(Australia) AuNW 1		Semifinal	Pole Grasper	Andrea Hah	1				
(Australia) AuNW 2		1st	Rumbling Dice	Olivia Vivian	1				
(Australia) AuNW 3		1st	Spider Jump	Olivia Vivian	1				
(Australia) AuNW 4		2nd	Salmon Ladder	Olivia Vivian	1				
(Australia) AuNW 5		2nd	I-Beam Gap	Olivia Vivian	1				
(Australia) AuNW 6		1st	Lightning Bolts	Olivia Vivian	1				
(Austria) NWAT 1		1st	Jumping Spider	Stefanie Edelmann	1				
(Austria) NWAT 2		2nd	Wingnuts	Stefanie Edelmann	1				
(Austria) NWAT 3		2nd	Sky Hooks	Stefanie Edelmann	1				
(China) SXW		Qualifiers	Clear	Ola Przybysz	1				
(Denmark) DNW		Semifinals	Unknown	Unknown	Unknown	Katherine Rasmussen or Jasmin Tordenro			
(France) LPDH 1		1st	Downhill Pipe Drop	Charlotte Dequevauviller	1				
(France) LPDH 2		Semifinal	Arm Rings	Chloé Henry	1				
(France) LPDH 3		1st	Double Dipper	Chloé Henry	1				
(France) LPDH 4		Semifinal	Bungee Road	Laura Mété	1				
(France) LPDH 5		1st	Doorknob Drop	Maurane Jelic	1				
(France) LPDH 6		1st	Propeller Bar	Angeline Serre	1				
(France) LPDH 7		3rd	Ultimate Cliffhanger	Maurane Jelic	1				
(France) LPDH 8		2nd	Crank it Up	Maurane Jelic	1				
(Germany) NWG 1		Semifinal	Spinning Bridge	Alix Arndt	1				
(Germany) NWG 2		Qualifiers (Round 2)	Salmon Ladder	Aleksandra Beese	1				
(Germany) NWG 3		Qualifiers (Round 2)	Helix Hang Salmon Roll	Lilli Kiesgen	2	Tabitha Eckfeld			
(Germany) NWG 4		1st	Wheel Flip	Arleen Schüßler	1				
(Germany) NWG 5		1st	Lightning Bolts	Stefanie Edelmann	1				
(Germany) NWG 6		3rd	Cane Lane	Stefanie Edelmann	1				
(Germany) NWG 7		Semifinal	Clear	Andrea Meßner	4	Stefanie Edelmann	Leonie Huber	Jolina Thormann	
(Germany) NWG 8		1st	Salmon Roll	Viktoria Krämer	1				
(Germany) NWG 9		2nd	Water Walls	Nicola Wulf	1				
(Germany) GAS 1		3rd	Super Salmon Ladder	(Netherlands) Astrid Sibon	1				
(Germany) GAS 2		3rd	Super Salmon Ladder	(Austria) Stefanie Edelmann	1				
(Germany) GKI 1	Ages 12–13	2nd	Clear	Ana	1				
(Germany) GPS 1		Unknown	Unknown	Unknown	Unknown				
(Germany) GPS 2		Unknown	Unknown	Unknown	Unknown				
(Germany) GPS 3		Semifinal	Archer Steps	Evi Sachenbacher-Stehle	1				
(Germany) GPS 4		Semifinal	Tuning Forks	Sarah Lombardi	1				
(Germany) GPS 5		Semifinal	Trapeze Swing	Irina Schlauch	1				
(Germany) GPS 6		Semifinal	Wing Swing	Christina Obergföll	1				
(Germany) GPS 7		Semifinal	Devil Steps	Christina Theiss	1				
(Germany) GPS 8		Semifinal	Catch and Release	Marie Mouroum	1				
(Hungary) NWH 1		Semifinal	Snake Run	Noémi Marosvölgyi	1				
(Hungary) NWH 2		Semifinal	Monkey Peg	Nikolett Szabó	1				
(Hungary) NWH 3		Semifinal Repechage	Power Tower	Alíz Kíra Papdi	1				
(Indonesia) SNWI 1		Semifinal	Shaking Bridge	Unknown	2	Herlina Gitaningsih		Puji Lestari	
(Indonesia) SNWI 2		Semifinal	Swing Jump	Raji'ah Salsabillah	1				
(Indonesia) IOM 1		Qualifiers	Domino Hill	Sherly Yusanti	1				
(Indonesia) IOM 2		Qualifiers	Wind Chimes	Unknown	9	Rezcha E. Vineria	Morina Anggarsari	Normalita H.	
(Indonesia) IOM 2		Qualifiers	Wind Chimes	Unknown	9	Sri Ayu Lestari	Fitria Shanty	Wenny N.	
(Indonesia) IOM 2		Qualifiers	Wind Chimes	Unknown	9	Selvi Elianora	Suci Yunita	Karmanah	
(Israel) NIL 1		Semifinal	Ring Swing	Unknown	2	Amor Paz		Dana Tayar	
(Israel) NIL 2		Semifinal	Ring Swing	Sapir Meir Fishelson	1				
(Israel) NIL 3		Semifinal	Tick Tock	Amor Paz	1				
(Israel) NIL 4		Semifinal	Déjà Vu	Sapir Cohen Carmi	1				
(Israel) NIL 5		1st	Warped Wall	Tom Shaked	1				
(Israel) NIC		Semifinal	Pipefitter	Lehi Ofri	1				
(Israel) IAS 2		1st	Deja Vu	Unknown	3	Tom Shaked	Daphne Gitler	Noa Meir	
(Italy) NWIT		Semifinal	Jump Hang	Chiara Limonta	1				
(Japan) SSK 1		1st	Rapid Descent	Naomi Wada†	1				
(Japan) SSK 2		2nd	Spider Walk	Chie Tanabe	1				
(Japan) SSK 3		1st	Balance Bridge	Waka Ayakura	1				
(Japan) SSK 4		1st	Rolling Log	Eriko Tsukamoto	1				
(Japan) SSK 5		1st	Jump Hang	Megumi Fujii	1				
(Japan) SSK 6		1st	Jump Hang	Unknown	3	Igano Hibari	Megumi Fujii	Momoko Yokata	
(Japan) SSK 7		1st	Jump Hang	Unknown	2	Igano Hibari		Masami Yusa	
(Japan) SSK 8		1st	Warped Wall	Igano Hibari	1				
(Japan) SSK 9		1st	Rolling Log	Unknown	4	Yuko Mizuno	Igano Hibari	Miho Nishimura	
(Japan) SSK 10		1st	Jump Hang	Unknown	4	Masami Yusa	Yuko Mizuno	Aoi Koike	
(Japan) SSK 11		1st	Rolling Log	Unknown	7	Miho Nishimura	Nami Ichinohe	Masami Yusa	Yuko Mizuno
(Japan) SSK 11		1st	Rolling Log	Unknown	7	Rena Yamada	Igano Hibari	(Romania) Andreea Răducan	
(Japan) SSK 12		1st	Warped Wall	Igano Hibari	1				
(Japan) SSK 13		1st	Jump Hang	Masami Yusa	1				
(Japan) SSK 14		1st	Warped Wall	Unknown	2	Igano Hibari		Masami Yusa	
(Japan) SSK 15		1st	Rolling Log	Unknown	4	Ayako Inada	Miss Sullivan	Emiko Raika	Unknown (#57)
(Japan) SSK 16		1st	Rolling Log	Emiko Raika	1				
(Japan) SSK 17		1st	Jump Hang	Ayako Miyake	1				
(Japan) SSK 18		1st	Pole Maze	Ayako Miyake	1				
(Japan) SSK 19		1st	Log Grip	Unknown	2	Chikako Mihara		Mayu Inui	
(Japan) SSK 20		1st	Log Grip	Mayu Inui	1				
(Japan) SSK 21		1st	Halfpipe Attack	(United States) Luci Romberg	1				
(Japan) SSK 22		1st	Halfpipe Attack	Hiroyo Shimada	1				
(Japan) SSK 23		1st	Halfpipe Attack	See LWS exceptions‡	2	Rie Komiya		Tomomi Arimatsu	
(Japan) SSK 24		1st	Log Grip	Unknown	5	Rie Komiya	Satomi Kadoi	Sachiyo Yamada	
(Japan) SSK 24		1st	Log Grip	Unknown	5	Tomomi Arimatsu		Ayako Inada	
(Japan) SSK 25		0th	N/A	No LWS	0	No Obstacles Cleared			
(Japan) SSK 26		1st	Rolling Escargot	Unknown	3	Ayaka Suzuki	Rie Komiya	Aya Vanessa	
(Japan) SSK 27		1st	Halfpipe Attack	Hiroyo Shimada	2	Satomi Kadoi			
(Japan) SSK 28		1st	Spin Bridge	See LWS exceptions‡	1	Hiroyo Shimada†			
(Japan) SSK 29		1st	Jump Hang Kai	Mika Watanabe	4	Tomomi Takano	RENA	Hikaru Nakajima	
(Japan) SSK 30		1st	Jump Hang Kai	See LWS exceptions‡	2	(Russia) Antonina Seleznyova		Rumi Hanai	
(Japan) SSK 31		1st	Warped Wall	Yuka Murofushi	2	Ayano Oshima			
(Japan) SSK 32		1st	Warped Wall	See LWS exceptions‡	1	(United States) Kacy Catanzaro†			
(Japan) SSK 33		1st	Double Pendulum	Kana Watanabe	2	Mao Usami			
(Japan) SSK 34		3rd	Ultra Crazy Cliffhanger	(United States) Jessie Graff	1				
(Japan) SSK 35		1st	Wing Slider	See LWS exceptions‡	1	Karina Maruyama†			
(Japan) SSK 36		1st	Warped Wall	See LWS exceptions‡	1	Ayano Oshima†			
(Japan) SSK 37		3rd	Cliffhanger Dimension	(United States) Jessie Graff	1				
(Japan) SSK 38		1st	Dragon Glider	Ayano Oshima	2	Mai Watanabe			
(Japan) SSK 39		1st	Double Warped Wall	Ayano Oshima	1				
(Japan) SSK 40		2nd	Wall Lifting	See LWS exceptions‡	1	(Austria) Stefanie Edelmann†			
(Japan) SSK 41		1st	Dragon Glider	See LWS exceptions‡	1	Ayano Oshima†			
(Japan) SSK 42		2nd	Rolling Log	(Australia) Olivia Vivian	1				
(Japan) SSK 43		1st	Warped Wall	(United States) Jessie Graff	1				
(Japan) SJR 1	Ages 8–12	1st	Unknown	Unknown	Unknown				
(Japan) SJR 2	Ages 8–12	1st	Power Rolling	Asami Rikukawa	1				
(Japan) SJR 3	Ages 8–12	2nd	Slant Run	Aya Sakai	1				
(Japan) SJR 4	Ages 8–12	1st	Power Rolling	Miwako Ito	1				
(Japan) SJR 5	Ages 8–12	2nd	Slant Run	Maya Hayashi	1				
(Japan) SJR 6	Ages 8–12	1st	Unknown	Unknown	Unknown				
(Japan) SJC	Ages 10–12	2nd	Clear	Haruka Nagashima	1				
(Malaysia) SMY 1		Unknown	Unknown	Unknown	Unknown				
(Malaysia) SMY 2		Unknown	Unknown	Unknown	Unknown				
(Mongolia) MNWS		1st	Jump Hang	Unknown	3	G. Otgontsooj	(France) Mariana Firoud	L. Mönkhzayaa	
(Netherlands) NWNL		Semifinal	Wind Chimes	Vera Zijlstra	1				
(Poland) NWP 1		Semifinal	Propeller Bar	Marta Staroń	1				
(Poland) NWP 2		Qualifiers	Floating Stairs	Katarzyna Jonaczyk	1				
(Poland) NWP 3		1st	Flying Shelf Grab	Katarzyna Baranowska	1				
(Poland) NWP 4		Semifinal	Bar Hop	Paula Kulig	1				
(Poland) NWP 5		Semifinal	Ring Chaser	Klaudia Burs	1				
(Poland) NWP 6		Semifinal	Drum Hopper	Dorota Gadzińska	2	Aleksandra Krawczyk			
(Poland) NWP 7		1st	Slingshot	Katarzyna Jonaczyk	1				
(Poland) NWP 8		1st	Cannonball Drop	Katarzyna Jonaczyk	1				
(Poland) NWP 9		1st	Slingshot	Katarzyna Jonaczyk	1				
(Poland) NWP 10		1st	Clear	Katarzyna Jonaczyk	1				
(Romania) NWRO		Semifinal	Domino Pipes	Ilka Kis	1				
(Russia) RNNW 1		Semifinal	Propeller Bar	Julia Zhulyova	1				
(Russia) RNNW 2		Qualifiers		Unknown	4	Anastasia Larina	Daria Sautieva	Maria Smyshlyaeva	Anastasia Mikhina
(Russia) RNNW 3		1st	Wind Chimes	Anastasia Larina	1				
(Russia) SUN 1		Semifinal	Clear	Anna Ivanova	1				
(Russia) SUN 2		Semifinal	Clear	Anastasia Larina	1				
(Russia) SUN 3		Semifinal	Clear	Anastasia Larina	1				
(Russia) SNK 1	Ages 9–10	1st	Ring Chaser	Veronika Nikiforova	1				
(Russia) SNK 1	Ages 11–12	1st	Clear	Anna Sedova	1				
(Singapore) SSG 1		1st	Jump Hang	Unknown	5	Pauline Yong	Vivian Ng	Jade Seah	
(Singapore) SSG 1		1st	Jump Hang	Unknown	5	Ho Shu Yong		Nu Diana Khalid	
(Singapore) SSG 2		1st	Jump Hang	Unknown	6	Jennifer Ng	Kat Wang	Nur Fatin Bte Amir	
(Singapore) SSG 2		1st	Jump Hang	Unknown	6	Reiko Yoshida	Norfazilah Sowtail	Dinie Lyliana	
(Spain) NWES 1		Semifinal	Salmon Ladder	Beatriz Allo	1				
(Spain) NWES 2		Semifinal	Flying Shelf Grab	Celine Pignolet	1				
(Sweden) NWSV 1		Semifinal	Salmon Ladder	Anja Hodann	1				
(Sweden) NWSV 2		1st	Jumping Spider	Linda Digby	1				
(Switzerland) NWSW 1		Qualifiers	Warped Wall	(Netherlands) Astrid Sibon	1				
(Switzerland) NWSW 2		1st	Iron Maiden	(Netherlands) Astrid Sibon	1				
(Switzerland) SWPS 1		Unknown	Unknown	Unknown	Unknown				
(Switzerland) SWPS 2		Unknown	Unknown	Unknown	Unknown				
(Switzerland) SWPS 3		Unknown	Unknown	Unknown	Unknown				
(Turkey) NWTU 1		Qualifiers	Jump Hang	Unknown	14	Gözde Yorgun	Coraline Chapatte	Tuba Dokur	Seda Ocak
(Turkey) NWTU 1		Qualifiers	Jump Hang	Unknown	14	Anil Ünal	Fatma Şeker	Dílşat Yapici	Müjgan Demir
(Turkey) NWTU 1		Qualifiers	Jump Hang	Unknown	14	Betül Şen	Nalan Küçükakyüz	Gülcan Güven	Kübra Başaran
(Turkey) NWTU 1		Qualifiers	Jump Hang	Unknown	14	Ekín Göktas	Berçín Ünal		
(Turkey) NWTU 2		Qualifiers	Warped Wall	Hatice Erdoğan	1				
(United Kingdom) NWUK 1		1st	Pipe Slider	Katie McDonnell	1				
(United Kingdom) NWUK 2		Semifinal	Warped Wall	Sam Rippington	1				
(United Kingdom) NWUK 3		Semifinal	Clear	Katie McDonnell	1				
(United Kingdom) NWUK 4		1st	Rolling Log	Georgia Munroe	1				
(United Kingdom) NWUK 5		1st	Log Runner	Beth Lodge	1				
(United States) ANC 3		1st	Half-Pipe Attack	Luci Romberg	1				
(United States) ANC 4		1st	Jumping Spider	Luci Romberg	1				
(United States) ANW 1		Qualifiers	Pipe Slider	Luci Romberg	2	Lisanna Haskins			
(United States) ANW 2		Qualifiers	Jumping Bars	Lisanna Haskins	2	Sarah Molasky			
(United States) ANW 3		Qualifiers	Jump Hang	Natalie Strasser	3	Aqueela Zoll		Julie Hopper	
(United States) ANW 4		1st	Jumping Spider	Selena Laniel	1				
(United States) ANW 5		1st	Jumping Spider	Jessie Graff	2	Joyce Shahboz			
(United States) ANW 6		1st	Warped Wall	Meagan Martin	1				
(United States) ANW 7		1st	Warped Wall	Jessie Graff	2	Meagan Martin			
(United States) ANW 8		2nd	Wave Runner	Jessie Graff	1				
(United States) ANW 9		2nd	Criss-Cross Salmon Ladder	Allyssa Beird	1				
(United States) ANW 10		1st	Twist and Fly	Jesse Labreck	1				
(United States) ANW 11		1st	Twist and Fly	Jesse Labreck	1				
(United States) ANW 12		2nd	Power Tower	Jesse Labreck	1				
(United States) ANW 13		2nd	Double Salmon Ladder	Jesse Labreck	1				
(United States) ANW 14		1st	Dipping Birds	Addy Herman	1				
(United States) ANW 15		1st	Dipping Birds	Taylor Greene	1				
(United States) ANW 16		1st	Thread the Needle	Taylor Greene	1				
(United States) AJR 1	Ages 9–10	1st	Clear	Taylor Greene	1				
(United States) AJR 1	Ages 11–12	1st	Clear	Ella McRitchie	1				
(United States) AJR 1	Ages 13–14	Semifinal	Clear	Unknown	2	Celena Vanhaezebrouck		Sophia Lavallee	
(United States) AJR 2	Ages 9–10	Semifinal	Clear	Brynli Smith	1				
(United States) AJR 2	Ages 11–12	1st	Clear	Sienna Perez	1				
(United States) AJR 2	Ages 13–14	Semifinal	Sky Hooks	Sophia Lavallee	1				
(United States) AJR 3	Ages 9–10	1st	Clear	Liz Polsgrove	1				
(United States) AJR 3	Ages 13–14	1st	Clear	Taylor Greene	1				
(Vietnam) SVN 1		2nd	Salmon Ladder	Nguyễn Đinh Mỹ Linh	1				
(Vietnam) SVN 2		2nd	Salmon Ladder	(United States) Grace Jones	1				
(Vietnam) SVN 3		1st	Log Grip	Unknown	2	Thuỳ Trâm Đức Nguyễn		Xuyến Thị Nguyễn	
(Vietnam) SVN 4		3rd	Hang Climbing	(Australia) Olivia Vivian	1				
(Vietnam) SVN 5		3rd	Hang Climbing	(Australia) Olivia Vivian	1				

== Last Man Standing (LMS) exceptions ==
Sasuke does not directly award the title of Last Man Standing. On occasion, the distinction of Final Contender will instead be awarded as the top title of the season. Due to this, it is possible for the Final Contender to have not achieved a Best Result. Below are the results of all instances where no Last Man Standing was awarded, and the Final Contender did not have Best Result.

Season	Division	Stage	Obstacle	#	Last Man Standing (LMS)
(Japan) SSK 9		3rd	Rumbling Dice	98	Shingo Yamamoto
(Japan) SSK 14		3rd	Jumping Bars	100	Makoto Nagano
(Japan) SSK 16		3rd	Devil Balanço	100	Makoto Nagano
(Japan) SSK 29		3rd	Crazy Cliffhanger	97	Hitoshi Kanno
(Japan) SSK 32		3rd	Flying Bar	97	Tomohiro Kawaguchi
(Japan) SSK 33		3rd	Flying Bar	100	Yusuke Morimoto

== List of competitors with the most regulation buzzers (top 50) ==
Below is a list of the top 50 Ninja Warrior competitors worldwide based on regulation buzzers. The order of stages is listed in reverse order, with the most prestigious buzzers on the left, moving towards the least on the right.

Indicates competitors competing in 2025 Ninja Warrior seasons.

Indicates competitors who have retired from Ninja Warrior

#	Competitor	Totals			National Finals				Preliminary		
#	Competitor	Overall	Finals	Prelim	Final	3rd	2nd	1st	1st EX	2nd-Lite	1st-Lite
1	(United States) Drew Drechsel	43	28	15	1	1	11	15	5	—	10
2	(Germany) Moritz Hans	42	18	24	1	3	7	7	2	10	12
3	(Germany) René Casselly	41	21	20	1	3	8	9	3	6	11
4	(United States) Daniel Gil	36	20	16	1	2	6	11	6	1	9
5	(France) Jean Tezenas	34	18	16	1	4	6	7	1	6	9
6	(United States) David Campbell	34	14	20	1	1	5	7	6	1	13
7	(Japan) Toshihiro Takeda	33	32	1	—	—	13	19	—	—	1
8	(Japan) Yusuke Morimoto	33	31	2	2	5	11	13	—	—	2
9	(United States) Joe Moravsky	33	15	18	—	—	6	9	7	1	10
10	(Japan) Makoto Nagano	32	31	1	1	5	11	14	—	—	1
11	(Germany) Simon Brunner	32	9	23	—	—	4	5	2	10	11
12	(Japan) Shingo Yamamoto	31	30	1	—	2	11	17	—	—	1
13	(Germany) Oliver Edelmann	30	9	21	—	—	2	7	2	7	12
14	(Japan) Yuji Urushihara	29	29	0	2	3	9	15	—	—	—
15	(Japan) Shunsuke Nagasaki	26	24	2	—	1	8	15	—	—	2
16	(Poland) Grzegorz Niecko	26	10	16	—	2	4	4	1	5	10
17	(Poland) Robert Bandosz	26	6	20	—	—	2	4	1	8	11
18	(Japan) Masashi Hioki	25	23	2	—	—	9	14	—	—	2
19	(United States) Flip Rodriguez	25	10	15	—	—	2	8	5	2	8
20	(Switzerland) Joel Mattli	25	9	16	1	1	2	5	1	6	9
21	(Germany) Alexander Wurm	25	9	16	—	1	4	4	3	6	7
22	(Australia) Mike Snow	25	6	19	—	—	1	5	8	—	11
23	(Germany) Sladjan Djulabic	25	6	19	—	—	1	5	2	7	10
24	(Poland) Michał Grochoła	24	12	12	—	1	5	6	—	5	7
25	(Poland) Jan Tatarowicz	24	11	13	1	2	3	5	1	3	9
26	(United States) James McGrath	24	7	17	—	—	3	4	4	2	11
27	(United States) Ryan Stratis	23	7	16	—	—	2	5	5	—	11
28	(Japan) Jun Sato	22	20	2	—	—	8	12	1	—	1
29	(United States) Jamie Rahn	22	5	17	—	—	—	5	4	1	12
30	(Japan) Tomohiro Kawaguchi	21	19	2	—	1	8	10	1	—	1
31	(France) Clément Gravier	21	14	7	2	3	4	5	—	3	4
32	(Poland) Wiktor Wójcik	21	10	11	—	1	4	5	—	2	9
33	(United States) Sean Bryan	21	8	13	—	—	4	4	3	1	9
34	(Germany) Benjamin Grams	21	4	17	—	—	2	2	2	6	9
35	(Germany) Daniel Gerber	21	3	18	—	—	1	2	1	8	9
36	(Australia) Ben Polson	20	12	8	1	1	3	7	2	—	6
37	(Germany) Philipp Göthert	20	11	9	—	1	5	5	—	5	4
38	(Australia) Fred Dorrington	20	7	13	—	—	2	5	5	1	7
39	(United States) Travis Rosen	20	7	13	—	—	1	6	3	—	10
40	(Poland) Paweł Murawski	20	6	14	—	—	3	3	—	3	11
41	(Poland) Jakub Zawistowski	20	4	16	—	—	1	3	1	4	11
42	(Japan) Kenji Takahashi	19	19	0	—	1	8	10	—	—	—
43	(Japan) Ryo Matachi	19	17	2	—	2	5	10	1	—	1
44	(United States) Brent Steffensen	19	10	9	—	—	3	7	1	—	8
45	(Switzerland) Sandro Scheibler	19	9	10	—	1	4	4	—	4	6
46	(Poland) Przemysław Jańczuk	19	7	12	—	—	3	4	—	2	10
47	(Germany) Artur Schreiber	19	1	18	—	—	—	1	—	7	11
48	(United States) R.J. Roman	18	9	9	—	2	3	4	2	2	5
49	(France) Thomas Hubener	18	8	10	—	1	3	4	1	3	6
50	(United States) Jake Murray	18	7	11	—	—	1	6	4	—	7

== List of female competitors with the most regulation buzzers (minimum of 5) ==
Below is a list of female Ninja Warrior competitors worldwide with at least 5 regulation buzzers. The order of stages is listed in reverse order, with the most prestigious buzzers on the left, moving towards the least on the right.

Indicates competitors competing in 2025 Ninja Warrior seasons.

Indicates competitors who have retired from Ninja Warrior

#		Competitor	Totals				National Finals		Women's Only				Preliminary		
Women	Overall	Competitor	Overall	Finals	Women's	Prelim	2nd	1st	Final	3rd	2nd	1st	1st EX	2nd-Lite	1st-Lite
1	61	(Austria) Stefanie Edelmann	17	5	0	12	1	4	—	—	—	—	—	4	8
2	91	(Australia) Olivia Vivian	14	6	0	8	2	4	—	—	—	—	4	—	4
3	97	(United States) Jesse Labreck	14	2	1	11	—	2	—	—	—	1	3	—	8
4	100	(Japan) Ayako Miyake	13	0	13	0	—	—	3	3	3	4	—	—	—
5	126	(United States) Jessie Graff	12	6	0	6	2	4	—	—	—	—	—	—	6
6	162	(Japan) Yuko Mizuno	10	0	10	0	—	—	—	2	4	4	—	—	—
7	180	(Poland) Katarzyna Jonaczyk	10	0	0	10	—	—	—	—	—	—	—	2	8
8	—	(Japan) Rie Komiya	9	0	9	0	—	—	1	1	3	4	—	—	—
9	—	(Japan) Ayano Oshima	8	1	7	0	—	1	1	1	2	3	—	—	—
10	—	(United States) Meagan Martin	8	0	0	8	—	—	—	—	—	—	2	—	6
11	—	(France) Maurane Jelic	7	1	0	6	1	—	—	—	—	—	—	4	2
12	—	(United Kingdom) Beth Lodge	7	1	0	6	—	1	—	—	—	—	1	—	5
13	—	(Japan) Kazue Watanabe	7	0	7	0	—	—	—	1	3	3	—	—	—
14	—	(Japan) Mika Watanabe	6	0	6	0	—	—	—	1	1	4	—	—	—
15	—	(Japan) Sayaka Asami	6	0	6	0	—	—	—	—	3	3	—	—	—
16	—	(Netherlands) Astrid Sibon	6	0	0	6	—	—	—	—	—	—	—	2	4
17	—	(Netherlands) Saskia Neville	6	0	0	6	—	—	—	—	—	—	—	—	6
17	—	(United Kingdom) Alix Arndt	6	0	0	6	—	—	—	—	—	—	—	—	6
19	—	(United States) Allyssa Beird	5	1	0	4	—	1	—	—	—	—	—	—	4
20	—	(Japan) Maho Tanaka	5	0	5	0	—	—	—	1	2	2	—	—	—
21	—	(United States) Taylor Greene	5	0	2	3	—	—	—	—	1	1	—	1	2
22	—	(United Kingdom) Katie McDonnell	5	0	0	5	—	—	—	—	—	—	2	—	3
23	—	(Germany) Arleen Schüßler	5	0	0	5	—	—	—	—	—	—	—	—	5
