= Ninja Warrior UK series 1 =

Season of British realty/sport competition television series Ninja Warrior UK

Ninja Warrior UK
- Series 1
- Presented by: Ben Shephard; Chris Kamara; Rochelle Humes
- No. of contestants: 250
- Finals venue: Manchester Central
- No. of episodes: 8

Release
- Original network: ITV
- Original release: 11 April – 30 May 2015

Series chronology
- Next → Series 2

Series One of Ninja Warrior UK, a British physical obstacle assault course game show, was aired on ITV during 2015, from 11 to 30 April May. Of the 250 contestants that took part, the series' competition was won by Timothy Shieff. During its broadcast, the series averaged around 3.76 million viewers.

== Ratings ==
Episode	Air date	Viewers (millions)	ITV weekly ranking
Heat 1	11 April 2015	3.32	16
Heat 2	18 April 2015	3.22	16
Heat 3	25 April 2015	3.93	15
Heat 4	2 May 2015	4.25	15
Heat 5	9 May 2015	3.70	16
Semi-final 1	16 May 2015	4.05	15
Semi-final 2	23 May 2015	3.58	14
Final	30 May 2015	4.08	14
