= Ninja Warrior UK series 2 =

Season of British realty/sport competition television series Ninja Warrior UK

Ninja Warrior UK
- Series 2
- Presented by: Ben Shephard; Chris Kamara; Rochelle Humes
- No. of contestants: 250
- Finals venue: Manchester Central
- No. of episodes: 8

Release
- Original network: ITV
- Original release: 2 January – 13 February 2016

Series chronology
- ← Previous; Series 1 Next → Series 3

Series Two of Ninja Warrior UK, a British physical obstacle assault course game show, was aired on ITV during 2016, from 2 January to 13 February. Prior to the final episode of the previous series, the broadcaster decided it would renew the show for a second series, making the announcement on 29 May 2015. Of the 250 contestants, this series' competition was won by Owen McKenzie. During its broadcast, the series averaged around 3.53 million viewers.

== Series overview ==
=== Qualifier ===
In the course of the five qualifier rounds, the contestants faced a variety of different obstacles in each round, alongside Quintuple Steps and Warped Wall. The most common featured included Floating Tiles, Jump Hang - the obstacle featured different ways of reaching the cargo net it used - and Spinning Logs, while other obstacles used included Frame Slider, Silk Slider, Pole Rider, Ring Toss, Swing Frames, Swing Circles, Double Tilt Ladder, Spinning Hoops, Curtain Slider, and UFO.

Qualifier 1 Results

Rank	Finalist	Outcome	Time/Obstacle Reached
1	Owen Mckenzie	Completed	00:53
2	Timothy Shieff	Completed	00:58
3	Andrei Burton	Completed	01:23
4	Michael Ferran	Completed	02:48
5	Gareth Weir	Failed	Warped Wall
6	Peter Adams	Failed	Spinning Hoops
7	Sam Neil	Failed	Jump Hang
8	Lea Stephenson	Failed	Jump Hang
9	Gen Tando Dwyer	Failed	Jump Hang
10	Joseph Johnston	Failed	Jump Hang

Qualifier 2 Results

Rank	Finalist	Outcome	Time/Obstacle Reached
1	Toby Segar	Completed	01:13
2	Patrick Pretorius	Completed	01:39
3	Dave Dickson	Completed	02:12
4	Kane Dick	Completed	02:14
5	Chris Sansom	Completed	02:45
6	John Geesley	Failed	Warped wall
7	Junior Arscott	Failed	Warped wall
8	Alex Bannister	Failed	Warped wall
9	Jane Cooke	Failed	Warped wall
10	Hannah Rose Kaynes	Failed	Double tilt ladder

Qualifier 3 Results

Rank	Finalist	Outcome	Time/Obstacle Reached
1	Teige Matthews-Palmer	Completed	00:51
2	Chase Armitage	Completed	01:20
3	Alex Middlecott	Completed	01:24
4	Junrid McClymont	Completed	01:32
5	Jonathan Meynell	Completed	02:58
6	Danny Charge	Failed	Warped wall
7	Graham Cooper	Failed	Warped wall
8	Dean Whitfield	Failed	Warped wall
9	Alex Everitt	Failed	Warped wall
10	Rick Holt	Failed	Jump hang

Qualifier 4 Results

Rank	Finalist	Outcome	Time/Obstacle Reached
1	Tim Champion	Completed	02:15
2	Ruel Dacosta	Completed	02:23
3	Callum Hardingham	Completed	03:11
4	Michael Gray	Failed	Swinging frames
5	Maximilian Tyler	Failed	Swinging frames
6	Gen Weeks	Failed	Swinging frames
7	Linford Dash	Failed	Swinging frames
8	Ian Norman	Failed	Floating tiles
9	Vanessa English	Failed	Floating tiles
10	Sam Rippington	Failed	Floating tiles

Qualifier 5 Results

Rank	Finalist	Outcome	Time/Obstacle Reached
1	Otis Khan	Completed	2:41
2	James Pollard	Completed	3:43
3	Philip Ashcroft	Failed	Warped wall
4	Ashton Tre	Failed	Warped wall
5	Corbin Mackin	Failed	Ring toss
6	Paul Everett	Failed	Ring toss
7	Robert McCarroll	Failed	Ring toss
8	Carl Padget	Failed	Ring toss
9	James McGladdery	Failed	Ring toss
10	Robert Watson	Failed	Ring toss

=== Semi-finals ===
For the semi-finals of this series, the semi-finalists had to complete Stage 1 of the course within two minutes. Alongside the Quintuple Steps and Warped Wall, they also had to contend with Barrel Rider, Spinning Log, a new variation of Jump Hang, and Spider Jump. Upon completing the stage, they then faced the obstacles of Stage 2, consisting of Wind Chimes, Arm Rings, and Chimney Climb.

Semi-finals results

Rank	Finalist	Outcome	Time/Obstacle Reached
1	Teige Matthews-Palmer	Completed	02:28
2	Alex Middlecott	Completed	02:32
3	Owen McKenzie	Completed	02:54
4	Junrid McClymont	Completed	03:07
5	Ruel Dacosta	Completed	03:13
6	Corbin Mackin	Completed	03:22
7	Tim Champion	Completed	03:26
8	Patrick Pretorius	Completed	03:44
9	Toby Segar	Completed	03:46
10	Gareth Weir	Completed	03:54
11	Andrei Burton	Completed	04:01
12	Chris Sansom	Completed	05:11
13	Timothy Shieff	Failed	Arm rings
14	Kane Dick	Failed	Arm rings
15	Callum Hardingham	Failed	Wind chimes

=== Final ===
For the finals of this series, only two of the three stages of obstacles were conducted. Stage 1 required finalists to complete nine obstacles - Quintuple Steps, Pipe Slider, Paddle Boards, Jump Hang, Spider Jump, Warped Wall, Chain Swing, Spinning Bridge, and Invisible Ladder - within three minutes. Of the finalists that took this stage on, only three of them successfully completed the course - Timothy Shieff, Toby Segar and Owen McKenzie.

Stage 2 required the remaining finalists to complete five obstacles - Rope Jungle, Salmon Ladder, Unstable Bridge, Cycle Road, and Wall Lift - within 75 seconds. None managed to complete the course, being defeated by Salmon Ladder, thus the winner was determined by overall progress. Of the three finalists, McKenzie was declared the winner, managing to get further on the obstacle than Shieff and Segar.

== Ratings ==
Episode	Air date	Viewers (millions)	ITV weekly ranking
Heat 1	2 January 2016	3.35	13
Heat 2	3 January 2016	2.64	22
Heat 3	9 January 2016	3.41	19
Heat 4	16 January 2016	3.77	16
Heat 5	23 January 2016	3.85	15
Semi–final 1	30 January 2016	3.72	15
Semi–final 2	6 February 2016	3.84	16
Final	13 February 2016	3.72	16
