= Kunoichi (TV series) =

- 女: KUNOICHI(クノイチ); Kunoichi
- Also known as: Women of Ninja Warrior; Kunoichi - Women's Sasuke
- Genre: Sports entertainment, obstacle course
- Based on: Sasuke by Ushio Higuchi
- Voices of: Keisuke Hatsuta (2001–2006, 2009); Hayato Arima (2003); Wataru Ogasawara (2004-2007, 2025); Jun Umeda (2007); Fumiyasu Sato (2009); Kengo Komada (2006, 2017–2018); Shinya Sugiyama (2017–2018, 2025); Ryusuke Ito (2018); Koki Ozawa (2025)
- Narrated by: Tsutomu Tareki (2001-2004, 2017-2018); Ken Taira (2006); Kiyoshi Kobayashi (2006–2007); Yoshikazu Hirano (2009); Jun Hattori (2025)
- Country of origin: Japan
- Original language: Japanese
- No. of episodes: 13

Production
- Executive producer: Inui Masato
- Producers: Kogake Yoshiyuki; Makoto Fujii
- Production locations: Makuhari Messe, Mihama-ku, Chiba-shi, Japan
- Running time: 30 minutes (US); 20 minutes (UK)

Original release
- Network: TBS
- Release: December 22, 2001 – present

Related
- Sasuke

Kunoichi (KUNOICHI(クノイチ); stylized as 女 KUNOICHI(クノイチ) in Japan) is a women's obstacle course competition held in Japan and broadcast on the Tokyo Broadcasting System. It is a spin-off of Sasuke, another obstacle course series. Kunoichi is different from Sasuke in that the competitors are exclusively female. The show is re-broadcast as Women of Ninja Warrior on the American G4 channel. It originally ran for 8 tournaments between 2001 and 2009 with the first tournament held as Kinniku Banzuke special. In 2017, after an 8-year hiatus, it was renewed for a 9th tournament which aired on February 12, 2017. After another 7-year hiatus, it was renewed once again under new name Kunoichi - Women's Sasuke for a 12th tournament which aired on January 13, 2025. Since the 9th tournament, the show moved from Mt. Midoriyama Studio City to an indoor course at the Makuhari Messe Convention Hall.

== Participants ==
Participants compete for a prize of 2 million yen ($25,497 U.S. dollars).

Each competition starts with 100 competitors from a range of backgrounds such as actors, comedians, housewives, and athletes, amateur and Olympians alike. The competitors are mainly Japanese, but many international competitors have participated. Since the 9th tournament, only 50 competitors participate instead likely due to insufficient amount of applicants.

=== Kunoichi All-Stars ===
Ayako Miyake (三宅 綾子, Miyake Ayako) - This three-time consecutive Kunoichi champion has earned her the nickname "Queen of Kunoichi". Weighing only 90 pounds (41 kg), Ayako is also an acrobatic dancer, who used to work for Muscle Musical. She achieved total victory in the 4th, 5th, and 6th competitions. In the 7th Competition however, she fell on the last obstacle of the Second Stage, the last part of the Swinging Beams, which was a metal beam without a rope support like the last two. Her failure left the other competitors in visible shock because, in the words of the narrator "She was the competitor everyone was counting on!" As of 2008, she has cleared the first stage four times in a row and the second, third and final stages three times in a row. Recently Ayako and a few other Muscle Musical members including the creator and Sayaka Asami broke away and created their own group, so it is now rumored that she will no longer compete. (This seems to be confirmed as she did not compete in Kunoichi 8.) In 2025, After 18-year hiatus, she will return to compete in Kunoichi's 13th Competition, She failed in Fish Bone in First Stage.

Rie Komiya (小宮理英, Komiya Rie) - This is one of the top competitors on Kunoichi and is notable for advancing all the way to the Third Stage in her first tournament, and failing Domino Hill(4th Competition). In the 5th Competition, she looked better than Miss Perfect herself, however by the time she reached the Skyway Pole in the final stage she looked defeated and her time ran out. She is a Japanese newscaster and went into modeling after her appearance on Kunoichi, before joining the Muscle Musical by the time of the 7th competition. Her run in the 6th competition was cut from the broadcast, but it is known that she failed stage 1. She was one of only four competitors who defeated the First Stage in the 7th competition, but she failed on the Monkey Bars in the Second Stage. As of 2008 she has cleared the first stage three times, the second stage twice, and the third stage once. Rie Komiya also competed in SASUKE 22, SASUKE 23, SASUKE 24 and SASUKE 26, being disqualified on the Jumping Spider and then failing the Half-pipe Attack, the Log Grip and the Rolling Escargot respectively. In Kunoichi 8 she became the second woman ever to beat the Final Stage.

Yuko Mizuno (水野 裕子, Mizuno Yuko) - After almost completing the Final Stage in the 2nd and 3rd Competitions, she was thought to be the most likely competitor to complete the Final Stage, and was once thought to be the "Queen of Kunoichi". In the 3rd Competition, Yuko missed the button by 0.2 seconds. That was later similar to Makoto Nagano in Sasuke 12 (he reached the top of Final Stage's tower and missed the red button by 0.11 seconds). Since then, she has only made it to the Third Stage once (in the 5th competition), and hasn't passed the First Stage in the 4th, 6th and 7th competition. Besides being a Kunoichi competitor, she is also a celebrity athlete, and a regular Sasuke competitor. Fans also call her Ms. Kunoichi, for her similar status to Mr. Sasuke, Katsumi Yamada. As of 2008 she has cleared the first stage three times, the second stage three times and the third stage twice. She is also known as the Katsumi Yamada of Kunoichi. In 2024, She was return to competed in Sasuke world cup 2024 as Team Japan Legend. In Kunoichi 12th competition, She was cleared first and second stage again, but failed Sidewinder in Third Stage.

Maho Tanaka (田中真帆, Tanaka Maho) - She is a professional snowboarder/wakeboarder. Maho was considered an All-Star of Kunoichi by the second time she has competed. She is known for her impressive speed nearly matching Ayako Miyake's records. Also she made it to the Final Stage during her second appearance, in the 6th tournament, where she completed the Third Stage most difficult obstacle, Domino Hill, at a very quick pace, that exceed any competitors' time who attempted or completed that obstacle (including Ayako Miyake). As she made it past the first three stages, it seems that she wasn't nervous about any obstacles standing in her way, but by the time she reached the Final Stage, she was unsure about her footing, constantly looking down, and began to lose speed on the Brick Climb, which by the time she completed time was already up. In the 7th tournament, she was the only competitor to reach the Third Stage, however she was defeated by the obstacle that she had defeated in the previous tournament, Domino Hill. In Kunoichi 8 she was eliminated when she wasn't one of the top two in her group to finish the first stage. As of 2010 she has cleared the first stage twice, the second stage twice and the third stage once.

=== Kunoichi New Stars ===
Ayano Oshima (大嶋 あやの, Oshima Ayano) - Former Shinkin Bank employee, who now works as a kids personal trainer and is also the protégé of SASUKE veteran Kawaguchi Tomohiro. She has competed in both Sasuke and Kunoichi. In Kunoichi 12 she became the fourth woman ever to beat the Final Stage.

=== Regulars ===
Kunoichi has several competitors who competing on a regular basis. Some of these include:

Yuko and Rena Higashi (東裕子・玲奈, Higashi Yuko/Rena) - A mother-daughter team. Though the mother, Yuko, has yet to complete the First Stage, Rena is the second 13-year-old to complete the First Stage (the first was Saki Suzuki in the 3rd competition), but she is the youngest to complete the Second Stage. Rena has also competed in the juniors division of Sasuke where she ran out of time just a few inches from the buzzer of the Final Stage. Yuko is a housewife, and her daughter is a tomboy and an athletic student, who joined the track and field team in order to train for Kunoichi. Rena also competed in Kunoichi 8, but she failed 1st Stage's Swinging Jump.

Sayaka Asami (浅見清香, Asami Sayaka) - Was the women's group leader in the related series, Muscle Musical. Before the Muscle Musical, she was part of the dance team DIG. Recently she broke away from Muscle Musical and formed her own group with Ayako Miyake. She competed from Kunoichi 3-5 and made it to the Third Stage all 3 times, but unfortunately failed Domino Hill all three times in exactly the same spot, in the same way. Asami's performances have earned herself a spot as one of the best competitors to date, but she will probably never compete again.

Mika Izumi (泉美香, Izumi Mika) - is a Jazz Dance Instructor hailing from Tokyo. She first appeared in the 3rd competition and wowed everyone by making it all the way to the Final Stage. Izumi managed a great run but ran out of time just a few feet short of the buzzer. In the following tournament, Izumi was the only finalist from the previous tournament to clear Stage 1, however in Stage 2 she failed the Triple Hurdle (a common casualty in Kunoichi 1 and 2). Since competing in Kunoichi, Izumi has married and her married name is Mika Watanabe. She also participated in SASUKE 12 and SASUKE 13, failing Stage 1's Jump Hang and Prism Tilt respectively. She returned after SASUKE was renamed SASUKE RISING. In SASUKE 28, she failed the Rolling Escargot. In SASUKE 29, like SASUKE 12, the redesigned Jump Hang (Jump Hang Kai) was her downfall.

Hiromi Satake (佐竹ひろみ, Satake Hiromi) - A professional sumo wrestler who, due to her large and overweight body, fails on the first obstacle in the First Stage every time. Since the start of Kunoichi, she has participated in all but the 5th Competition.

=== International participants ===
Kunoichi has a more diverse competition than Sasuke; in the 6th competition, over 20 different nations were represented.

A few foreign competitors include:

Kyra Gracie - A member of the Gracie Brazilian jiu-jitsu Family. She competed in the 6th Competition, but failed the First Stage's Balance Bridge.

Catalina Ponor - A Romanian Olympic gold medal gymnast, she competed in the 6th competition, where she failed the "Flying Pillar" in the First Stage.

Mirabella Akhunu - A Ukrainian gymnast who competed in the 2004 Athens Olympics. She made it to the Second Stage in the 5th competition, but failed on the Spinning Log.

Oana Ban - Romanian gymnastic gold medalist in the team competition at the 2004 Athens Olympics. She made it to the Second Stage in the 4th Competition, but failed on the Floating Bridge.

Tasha Schwikert - American gymnast, 2000 Olympian, Finished one second after her time ran out in the Second Stage of the 3rd Competition.

Diana Pickler - this American heptathlete from Washington State University competed in the 7th competition, but failed on the First Stage's Log Jam.

Sara Jean Underwood - the American model, 'Playboy Playmate of the Year 2007' and host of Attack of the Show competed in the 8th competition and made it to the Second Stage but she failed the Dancing Stones.

=== Other notable participants ===
At least four Sasuke all-stars - Shingo Yamamoto, Toshihiro Takeda, Katsumi Yamada, and Makoto Nagano - are known to be training Kunoichi competitors. Each of them competed in the 7th competition, with their mentors (except for Yamamoto) present.

- Yamamoto's trainee, Sayaka Okamoto who is an employee at his service station, advanced to the Second Stage of the 6th Competition (where Yamamoto was present) at just 16 years of age. However, her run is ended on the Second Stage, as she falling on the new Swinging Beams. In the 7th Competition, Okamoto failed on the First Stage's Log Jam. In the 8th Competition, she clear the First Stage yet again, but failed the Second Stage's Swinging Beams again. Like Yamamoto, Okamoto competed in her maroon Mobil 1 uniform shirt.
- Takeda's trainee, firefighter Keiko Oshima, who fights fires alongside Takeda, failed the newly redesigned Hop Rocket in the 7th Competition's First Stage. Oshima would be invited back in the 8th Competition, but failed to catch up the flag with Natsumi Hayashi and Ayako Kawahara (the latter being a member of Muscle Musical), by resulting she was eliminated.
- Nagano's trainee, fitness instructor Kaori Anraku, failed the Flying Pillar in the 7th Competition's First Stage.
- Yamada's trainee, walking instructor Nobuko Onoda, also went out on the newly redesigned Hop Rocket in the 7th Competition. It was said that they met through Onoda's father, who is a medical expert that Yamada once consulted about a shoulder injury.
- Nagano's wife, Asami Nagano competed in the 8th competition and actually timed out on the Net-Wall Climb but she won the Turntable-Balance Beam Challenge. In Stage 2, she failed the Barrel Roll.

Nagano has also trained his older sister, Taeko Uchida, who has yet to complete the First Stage.

Notable other competitors include:

- Asami Abe, J-Pop Singer (7)
- Fumie Nakajima, Member of the 'Shape UP Girls' fitness group (5, 7)
- Ikue Teshigawara, Short-Track speed skater from the Olympics (6, 8)
- Makoto Ogawa, Former member of Morning Musume (8)
- Saki Akai, professional wrestler and model (9)
- Sora Aoi, Actress (6–7)
- Kayo Haga, Former Tokyo Disneyland dancer and member of Muscle Musical (3–7)
- Airi Yoshihama, Former member of G-Rockets (2–3)
- Nao Oikawa, Actress (5)
- Narumi Kitagawa, Surfer (5–8)
- Masami Yusa, Beach Flags champion and lifesaver (1–5)
- Mikie Hara, Actress (8)
- Saori Yoshida, Freestyle Wrestling from the Olympics (4)
- Kana Watanabe, Judoka (9–10)
- Chie Nishimura, Stunt performer and homemaker (3–8)
- Ayaka Sakai, Samurai Rock Orchestra member and performer (9–11)
- Ayako Inada, Rhythmic Gymnastics from the Olympics and member of Muscle Musical (5–6, 8)
- Momoe Nakanishi, Professional Wrestler (3)
- Nao Watanabe, Lacrosse Player (3)
- Tomomi Hanzawa, Member of G-Rockets (3–4)
- Nami Ichinohe, Actress and member of Muscle Musical (3–4, 7)
- Reika Saiki, Professional Wrestler (9–11)
- Miho Yamada, Rhythmic Gymnastics from the Olympics (1–2, 4)
- Kazue Watanabe, Former track and field star (2–4)
- Hitomi Sakai, Idoling!!! member and TV personality (8)
- Tomomi Arimatsu, Member of Muscle Musical (8)
- Yoko Mori, Former member of C.C. Girls (1–3, 6–7)
- Sachiyo Yamada, Lacrosse Player (8)
- Yuka Kato, SONY Bravia Ladies Field Hockey (8)
- Aya Asahina, Actress (9–11)
- Erika Yazawa, Idoling!!! member and TV personality (8)
- Haruka Nakagawa, AKB48 and pre-JKT48 member (7)
- Sayaka Akimoto, AKB48 member (7)
- Haruka Futawara, SKE48 Member (9)
- Nana Suzuki, Talento (12)
- HARUKA, CYBERJAPAN Dancers (12)
- Miyu Matsuo, Nogizaka46 (12)
- Reina Seiji, NGT48 (13)

Youngest competitors include:

- Saki Suzuki, male student (sometimes called "she/her" in the G4 version), cleared the 1st stage but failed in Spinning log 2nd stage in the 3rd competition. He competed again in the 4th competition but he failed on Hop Rocket in 1st Stage. This competitor was the first male or young boy that competed in Kunoichi, but he never competed in Sasuke like some female Kunoichi competitors did. (3–4)
- Hioki Miyuna, Junior High School Student, Hioki Masashi's Daughter. (12)

== Stages ==
Kunoichi is composed of four stages, with the exception of the 1st, 2nd and 9th Competitions which consisted of only three stages each. Competitors must complete a stage in order to continue to the next stage. In the 9th competition, the First and Second Stage were renamed to the RED and BLUE Stage respectively. Then, in the 10th competition, the new Third Stage was renamed the BLACK Stage and thus the series returned to a 4-stage format. In the 12th competition, the first 3 stages returned to former names 1st Stage, 2nd Stage and 3rd Stage instead of RED, BLUE and BLACK Stage but still only used course theme.

=== First stage ===
Comp #	First Stage Obstacles										Time Limit
1	Dancing Stones	Windmill Cross		Barrel Roll		Tornado Run		Triple Jump		Escape Ladder	80.0
2	Dancing Stones	Windmill Cross		Barrel Roll		Gateway Bridge		Triple Jump		Escape Pole	90.0
3	Dancing Stones	Windmill Cross	Double Hurdle	Barrel Roll	Balance Bridge	Hop Rocket		Angle Run		Escape Ladder	85.0
4	Dancing Stones	Windmill Cross		Balance Bridge	Barrel Roll	Angle Run	Hop Rocket	Vertical Limit	Slippery Slide	Escape Ladder	105.0
5	Dancing Stones	Windmill Cross		Balance Bridge	Barrel Roll	Double Angle Run	Hop Rocket	Conviction Hill	Slippery Slide	Escape Ladder	100.0
6	Float Run	Prism Tilt	Flying Pillar	Balance Bridge	Barrel Roll	Double Angle Run		Falling Pole		Escape Ladder	95.0
7	Stepping Stones	Log Jam	Flying Pillar	Balance Bridge	Barrel Roll	Hop Rocket		Double Angle Run		Escape Ladder	90.0
8	Floating Hurdle	Log Bridge	Hanging Logs	Iron Prison	Swing Jump		Raft Pull		Exhausting Wall		120.0
9	Rolling Hill	Pipe Hold	Fish Bone		X Bridge	Jump Hang		Warped Wall		Cannonball	140.0
10	Rolling Hill	Pipe Hold	Shaking Bridge	Fish Bone		Double Pendulum		Warped Wall		Cannonball	110.0
11	Rolling Hill	Pipe Hold	Shaking Bridge	Fish Bone		Dragon Glider		Warped Wall		Cannonball	110.0
12	Rolling Hill	Screwdriver		Fish Bone		Dragon Glider		Double Warped Wall			100.0
13	Prism See-Saw	Screwdriver		Fish Bone		Dragon Glider		Double Warped Wall			90.0

=== Second chance round ===
Comp #	Second Chance Round Obstacles	Time Limit
8	Dizzy Dummy + Suspended Bridge (Turntable Bridge)	Untimed

=== Second stage ===
Comp #	Second Stage Obstacles							Time Limit
1	Super Jump	Spinning Slopes	Pendulum Bridge			Floating Bridge		50.0
2	Super Jump	Ledge Walk	Pendulum Bridge			Floating Bridge		45.0
3	Super Jump	Hill Climb	Spinning Log			Floating Bridge		40.0
4	Super Jump	Triple Jump	Spinning Log			Floating Bridge		35.0
5	Super Jump	Hill Climb	Spinning Log	Swinging Hammers		Floating Bridge		50.0
6	Super Jump	Triple Hurdle	Two Pole Bridge	Net Cross		Swinging Beams		70.0
7	Super Jump	Dancing Stones	Spinning Log	Monkey Bars		Swinging Beams		65.0
8	Super Jump	Triple Hurdle	Dancing Stones	Domino Hill	Barrel Roll	Swinging Beams		210.0
9	Slide Walk	Spider Walk	Reverse Conveyor	Slant Edge	Sponge Bridge	Cliffhanger	Waver Bridge	Unlimited
10	Slide Walk	Spider Walk	Hammer Dodge		Reverse Conveyor	Wall Lifting		75.0
11	Slide Walk	Spider Walk	Hammer Dodge		Reverse Conveyor	Wall Lifting		80.0
12	Rolling Log	Spider Run	Reverse Conveyor			Wall Lifting		80.0
13	Rolling Log	Spider Run	Backstream	Reverse Conveyor		Wall Lifting		90.0

=== Third stage ===
(There was no 3rd stage in Kunoichi 1, 2 and 9)

Comp #	Third Stage Obstacles					Time Limit
3	Double Super Vault		Domino Hill	Pendulum Bridge		90.0
4	Double Super Vault		Domino Hill	Pendulum Bridge		90.0
5	Unforgiving Wall		Domino Hill	Dreamer's Road		15.0 (For Final Obstacle)
6	Peg Jump		Domino Hill	Pendulum Bridge		Unlimited
7	Peg Jump		Domino Hill	Magic Wall		Unlimited
8	Flying Roll					Unlimited
10	Propeller Bars	Arm Bike	Sponge Bridge	Cliffhanger	Pipe Slider	Unlimited
11	Propeller Bars	Arm Bike	Sponge Bridge	Planet Bridge	Pipe Slider	Unlimited
12	Propeller Bars	Sidewinder	Sponge Bridge		Flying Bar	Unlimited
13	Lamp Grasper	Sidewinder	Sponge Bridge	Crazy Cliff	Pipe Slider	Unlimited

=== Final stage ===
Comp #	Final Stage Obstacles			Time Limit
1–2	Balance Walk			Unlimited
3–4	Ladder Climb	Pole Climb		35.0
5	Double Ladder Climb	Pole Climb		35.0
6	Brick Climb	Pole Climb		30.0
7	Net Climb	Rope Climb		Unknown
8	Steel Ladder	Climbing Boards		60.0
9	Ladder Climb	Rope Climb		35.0
10–12	Spider Climb	Rope Climb		35.0
13	Spider Climb	Salmon Ladder	Rope Climb	45.0

(No one made it to the Final Stage in 7, so the Time Limit is unknown). (Note: The 2008 plug-and-play game based on Sasuke reveals that the time limit is 30 seconds.)

== United States and United Kingdom broadcasts ==
The program can be seen in the United States as Women of Ninja Warrior on G4 and Esquire Network. Just like in the regular version, the play-by-play commentary and interviews with participants are subtitled in English while the introduction, player profiles, and replays have been dubbed by voice actor Dave Wittenberg. Each episode is a 30-minute portion of the Japanese broadcast. To date, the first eight competitions have aired in America. As with its sister program, Ninja Warrior, in G4's relaunch, the first seven episodes are edited with the opening sequence slightly edited with a widescreen version from the eighth episode then cuts to the show's logo, as transitions are replaced with a simple transition featuring the show's logo.

The show was also broadcast in the UK on the channel Challenge, re-using G4's edits with new dubbing across the board as done with Ninja Warrior. The first seven competitions were commentated by Stuart Hall, though Kunoichi 8 featured instead the voice of Jim North after Hall's firing. Challenge would later re-dub the first seven competitions with new commentary by North. Women of Ninja Warrior would follow its counterpart in being transferred to other channels including Sky One and E4 Extra.

Episodes also feature segments such as "Ninja Killer" (an obstacle from a stage that took out the most contestants), and "Warrior Wipeout" (the best wipeout from a Women of Ninja Warrior contestant). As of 2025, the first 8 competitions have been aired in both the US and UK.

== Results ==
The following is a list of people who advanced the farthest and reached at least the third stage in each competition. Under each competition, the results are listed in order of who went the farthest first.

=== 1st Competition ===
Aired: December 22, 2001

Competitor	Stage	Obstacle
No. 83 Miho Yamada	Second	Failed Super Jump
No. 100 Masami Yusa	Second	Failed Super Jump

NOTE: Nobody cleared the second stage in this competition, After this competition, in Sasuke 19th Competition only 2 Competitors Cleared first Stage and Failed 2nd stage like this first Kunoichi Competition.

=== 2nd Competition ===
Aired: December 21, 2002

Competitor	Stage	Obstacle
No. 81 Yuko Mizuno	Final	Failed Dreamer's Road
No. 89 Kazue Watanabe	Final	Failed Dreamer's Road
No. 96 Masami Yusa	Second	Failed Super Jump

=== 3rd Competition ===
Aired: September 24, 2003

Competitor	Stage	Obstacle
No. 100 Yuko Mizuno	Final	Failed Pole Climb (by 0.2 seconds)
No. 95 Tomomi Hanzawa	Final	Failed Pole Climb
No. 92 Mika Izumi	Final	Failed Pole Climb
No. 97 Nao Watanabe	Third	Failed Domino Hill
No. 85 Kazue Watanabe	Third	Failed Domino Hill
No. 81 Yoko Mori	Third	Failed Domino Hill
No. 78 Sayaka Asami	Third	Failed Domino Hill
No. 70 Airi Yoshihama	Third	Failed Domino Hill
No. 5 Momoe Nakanishi	Third	Failed Domino Hill
No. 84 Ruo	Third	Failed Double Super Vault
No. 71 Chie Nishimura	Third	Failed Double Super Vault
No. 99 Tasha Schwikert	Second	Failed Floating Bridge
No. 13 Maho Sugiyama	Second	Failed Floating Bridge
No. 75 Saki Suzuki	Second	Failed Spinning Log

NOTE: In Stage 1 Kazue Watanabe went after Nao Watanabe, indicating she was the 97th competitor to go.

=== 4th Competition ===
Aired: December 25, 2004

Competitor	Stage	Obstacle
No. 58 Ayako Miyake	Final	Completed Final Stage (4.1 seconds to spare)
No. 50 Kazue Watanabe	Third	Failed Domino Hill
No. 70 Rie Komiya	Third	Failed Domino Hill
No. 81 Saori Yoshida	Third	Failed Domino Hill
No. 90 Miho Yamada	Third	Failed Domino Hill
No. 95 Sayaka Asami	Third	Failed Domino Hill
No. 98 Oana Ban	Second	Failed Floating Bridge
No. 99 Mika Izumi	Second	Failed Triple Jump

=== 5th Competition ===
Aired: January 7, 2006

Competitor	Stage	Obstacle
No. 100 Ayako Miyake	Final	Completed Final Stage (7.72 seconds to spare)
No. 72 Rie Komiya	Final	Failed Pole Climb
No. 91 Yuko Mizuno	Third	Failed Domino Hill
No. 95 Sayaka Asami	Third	Failed Domino Hill
No. 83 Yuriko Imamura	Third	Failed Domino Hill
No. 90 Mirabella Akhunu	Second	Failed Spinning Log

=== 6th Competition ===
Aired: September 20, 2006

Competitor	Stage	Obstacle
No. 100 Ayako Miyake	Final	Completed Final Stage (0.66 seconds to spare)
No. 83 Maho Tanaka	Final	Failed Brick Climb*
No. 75 Mizuho Maeda	Third	Failed Pendulum Bridge
No. 88 Tomoka Iwai	Third	Failed Domino Hill
No. 96 Erin Jessica Dolty	Third	Failed Peg Jump
No. 51 Rena Higashi	Third	Failed Peg Jump
No. 66 Sayaka Okamoto	Second	Failed Swinging Beams
No. 79 Maya Tachikawa	Second	Failed Swinging Beams
No. 32 Tomoko Yoshida	Second	Failed Super Jump

- Tanaka completed the wall climb but her time ran out as she began the skyway pole.

NOTE: Numbers were not given out in this tournament but the producers had the order in which the competitors went. Only Miyake's and Tanaka's numbers were revealed because they made it to the Final Stage.

=== 7th Competition ===
Aired: September 5, 2007

Competitor	Stage	Obstacle
No. 91 Maho Tanaka	Third	Failed Domino Hill
No. 100 Ayako Miyake	Second	Failed Swinging Beams
No. 92 Nishimura Chie	Second	Failed Swinging Beams
No. 80 Rie Komiya	Second	Failed Monkey Bars

=== 8th Competition ===
Aired: October 7, 2009

Competitor	Stage	Obstacle
No. 52 Satomi Kadoi	Final	Completed Final Stage (21.4 seconds to spare)
No. 38 Rie Komiya	Final	Completed Final Stage (3.7 seconds to spare)
No. 46 Tomomi Arimatsu	Final	Disqualified on Climb Boards†
No. 1 Sachiyo Yamada	Third	Failed Flying Roll
No. 97 Yuka Kato	Third	Failed Flying Roll
No. 73 You Nakao	Second	Failed Swinging Beams
No. 66 Sayaka Okamoto	Second	Failed Swinging Beams
No. 3 Masumi Inoue	Second	Failed Swinging Beams
No. 94 Asami Nagano	Second	Failed Barrel Roll
No. 87 Ayako Kawahara	Second	Failed Barrel Roll
No. 57 Miku Asai	Second	Failed Barrel Roll
No. 34 Erika Tomooka	Second	Failed Barrel Roll
No. 12 Saori Amano	Second	Failed Barrel Roll
No. 98 Eiko Chiba	Second	Failed Domino Hill
No. 92 Kaya Takeuchi	Second	Failed Domino Hill
No. 85 Hayashi Natsumi	Second	Failed Domino Hill
No. 77 Ikue Teshigawara	Second	Failed Domino Hill
No. 70 Aiko Sato	Second	Failed Domino Hill
No. 55 Ango Uno	Second	Failed Domino Hill
No. 53 Ayako Inada	Second	Failed Domino Hill
No. 50 Sakuma Jennifer Tomoko	Second	Failed Domino Hill
No. 5 Rinako Yamada	Second	Failed Domino Hill
No. 84 Sara Jean Underwood	Second	Failed Dancing Stones
No. 67 Eri Yanagita	Second	Failed Dancing Stones
No. 41 Sakai Hitomi	Second	Failed Dancing Stones
No. 29 Shiho Onodera	Second	Failed Dancing Stones
No. 24 Makoto Ogawa	Second	Failed Dancing Stones
No. 80 Sumiko Nishioka	Second	Failed Super Jump
No. 64 Noriko Miyazaki	Second	Failed Super Jump
No. 61 Akiko Chubachi	Second	Failed Super Jump
No. 27 Natsuki Kamata	Second	Failed Super Jump
No. 19 Asami Nakabo	Second	Failed Super Jump
No. 14 Mika Kagoshima	Second	Failed Super Jump
No. 9 Mikie Hara	Second	Failed Super Jump
No. 7 Azusa Odashima	Second	Failed Super Jump

† Arimatsu cleared the final stage with 5.9 seconds on the clock but she grabbed the edge of the 2nd wall on the Climbing Board

=== 9th Competition ===
Aired: February 12, 2017

Competitor	Stage	Obstacle
No. 42 Hikari Izumi	Final	Failed Rope Climb
No. 44 Zhuyin Chen	BLUE	Failed Sponge Bridge
No. 45 Ayano Oshima	BLUE	Failed Sponge Bridge
No. 43 Kana Watanabe	BLUE	Failed Sponge Bridge
No. 48 Yuki Kawabata	BLUE	Failed Sponge Bridge

=== 10th Competition ===
Aired: July 2, 2017

Competitor	Stage	Obstacle
No. 50 Hikari Izumi	BLACK	Failed Pipe Slider
No. 49 Kana Watanabe	BLACK	Failed Pipe Slider
No. 40 Aya	BLACK	Failed Cliffhanger
No. 36 Sakiko Okabe	BLUE	Failed Wall Lifting
No. 32 Mika Watanabe	BLUE	Failed Reverse Conveyor
No. 7 Reika Saiki	BLUE	Failed Slide Walk

=== 11th Competition ===
Aired: July 1, 2018

Competitor	Stage	Obstacle
No. 32 Sakiko Okabe	Final	Failed Rope Climb
No. 47 Ayano Oshima	BLACK	Failed Pipe Slider
No. 42 Karu Yamamoto	BLACK	Failed Pipe Slider
No. 33 Airi Tsubuki	BLACK	Failed Sponge Bridge
No. 30 Ayaka Sakai	BLUE	Failed Wall Lifting
No. 40 Mio Sudo	BLUE	Failed Wall Lifting
No. 49 Mika Watanabe	BLUE	Failed Wall Lifting
No. 25 Kanon Miyahara	BLUE	Failed Hammer Dodge
No. 48 Reika Saiki	BLUE	Failed Spider Walk
No. 43 Aya Asahina	BLUE	Failed Spider Walk

=== 12th Competition ===
Aired: January 13, 2025

Competitor	Stage	Obstacle
No. 49 Ayano Oshima	Final	Completed Final Stage (8.97 seconds to spare)
No. 47 Hikaru Mori	Third	Failed Flying Bar
No. 42 Mai Watanabe	Third	Failed Sponge Bridge
No. 39 Tamaki Sakai	Third	Failed Sponge Bridge
No. 50 Yuko Mizuno	Third	Failed Sidewinder
No. 43 Honami Tsuboi	Third	Failed Sidewinder

=== 13th Competition ===
Aired: November 24, 2025

Competitor	Stage	Obstacle
No. 49 Ayano Oshima	Final	Failed Salmon Ladder
No. 43 Mai Watanabe	Final	Failed Salmon Ladder
No. 42 Ayumu Saito	Third	Failed Crazy Cliff
No. 39 Tamaki Sakai	Third	Failed Sponge Bridge
No. 44 Arisa Kimishima	Second	Failed Wall Lifting
No. 33 Erena Shinohara	Second	Failed Wall Lifting
No. 28 Gabby	Second	Failed Wall Lifting
No. 12 Kate Lotus	Second	Failed Wall Lifting
No. 24 Rina Yuki	Second	Failed Reverse Conveyor
No. 23 Reina Seiji	Second	Failed Reverse Conveyor
No. 22 Nonoka Kazami	Second	Failed Backstream
No. 30 Jura Enomoto	Second	Failed Spider Run
