= Isaac Caldiero =

American athlete

- Born: March 2, 1982 (age 44); Salt Lake City, Utah
- Occupations: Carpenter, ninja sport athlete, rock climber

Isaac Caldiero (born March 2, 1982) is an American athlete, former busboy, rock climber, and carpenter, who competed on American Ninja Warrior in seasons five, six, seven, and ten. He is best known for finishing all four stages of the National Finals course in season seven and becoming one of the Americans (along with Geoff Britten, David Campbell in SASUKE Vietnam 2, and later Drew Drechsel in season 11, then Daniel Gil and Vance Walker in season 15) to achieve what is known as "Total Victory". Caldiero was awarded a $1,000,000 cash prize after completing Stage 4 in a faster time than Geoff Britten.

== Career ==
=== Carpentry ===
Caldiero is a carpenter by trade.

=== Rock climbing ===
Caldiero, a rock climber, has made V14 (8B+) first ascents and 5.14 (8c/+) free solos. He started climbing at the age of 15, and bouldering at 17, and specializes in highball bouldering. He became one of the first to ropeless climb a 5.14a (8b+), on one of the first 5.14a established climbs in the U.S., "The Present" in southern Utah.

=== Ninja competitions ===
Caldiero first competed on American Ninja Warrior in season five, making it to the National Finals in Las Vegas. He successfully locked into the fourth obstacle of Stage 1, the Jumping Spider; however, he could not maintain his grip and fell before he completed the obstacle, later calling this a "wardrobe malfunction".

In season six, Caldiero performed well enough to again advance to the National Finals. He was able to complete Stage 1 of the Finals course, but failed on Stage 2's Double Salmon Ladder, ending his season.

Caldiero returned to Ninja Warrior in season seven and again advanced to the National Finals. He became the first competitor to finish Stage 3; fellow competitor Geoff Britten also finished the third Stage and advanced to Stage 4 along with Caldiero. Britten and Caldiero both completed the Stage 4 rope climb in the allotted time; Britten ran first, while Caldiero ran second and completed the Stage with a faster time. Because Caldiero's climb was faster, he was declared the season's official winner, and he received the title of the first "American Ninja Warrior." Because Britten ran first, however, some fans and competitors considered him to be the "first American Ninja Warrior"; Joe Moravsky stated: "In my opinion, Geoff is technically the first American Ninja Warrior and Isaac is the second. The only difference is Isaac climbed it faster so he gets the million and won the season." Caldiero, however, believed the dispute was unnecessary, saying "There is no distinction, it's the same title. There are pictures of me holding the trophy that says I'm the first American Ninja Warrior. I think they are trying to give him a moment too because he does deserve it, but as far as the rules go, there is one title. It's an all or nothing deal. If you look at other sports, if Michael Phelps beats everyone in the Olympics by a fraction of the second that's the way it is, even if everyone else 'finishes the course'." Caldiero has also been referred to as the "first American Ninja Warrior champion."

In season eight, Caldiero did not return to the competition. Instead, he served as a spokesman for the series and its sponsor, POM Wonderful. It was revealed that he would make a return to Ninja Warrior by participating in the celebrity special of Ninja Warrior Germany in November 2017.

On April 24, 2018, Caldiero confirmed he would come out of retirement to compete in season ten of Ninja Warrior in the Indianapolis region. While he cleared the qualifying course, he fell early in the Indianapolis city finals and was unable to qualify for the National Finals in Las Vegas.

== Personal life ==
Caldiero is the son of the polyartist Alex Caldiero and the brother of the poet Sara Caldiero. Despite having won the $1,000,000 prize from Ninja Warrior, he continues to live a simple lifestyle. He helps to develop Ninja Warrior gyms and can be found at Synergy Climbing and Ninja gym, bouldering at Stone Fort, volunteering or traveling the world with friends. He lives in Chattanooga, Tennessee.
