= American Ninja Warrior season 7 =

Season of American reality/sport competition television series American Ninja Warrior

American Ninja Warrior
- Season 7
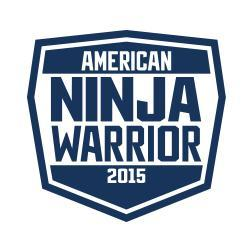
- Hosted by: Matt Iseman; Akbar Gbaja-Biamila; Kristine Leahy
- No. of contestants: 600
- Finals venue: Las Vegas, NV
- No. of episodes: 16

Release
- Original network: NBC; Esquire Network
- Original release: May 25 – September 14, 2015

Season chronology
- ← Previous; Season 6 Next → Season 8

The seventh season of American Ninja Warrior premiered on NBC on May 25, 2015. Hosts Matt Iseman and Akbar Gbaja-Biamila returned for their respective sixth and third seasons while newcomer Kristine Leahy joined as sideline reporter, replacing Jenn Brown. In addition, this season's grand prize was increased from $500,000 to $1,000,000. The season concluded on September 14, 2015.

For the first time in American Ninja Warrior history, a competitor completed Stage 3 in the Las Vegas National Finals. Both Geoff Britten and Isaac Caldiero completed Stage 3 and climbed Stage 4 in the allotted time of 30 seconds and achieved "Total Victory." Caldiero made the climb in the faster time and was the first competitor to be awarded the grand prize of $1,000,000. However, the title of "First American Ninja Warrior" was unofficially awarded by the community to Britten for being the first to climb the tower.

== Changes ==
This season's grand prize was doubled from $500,000 to $1,000,000.

== Cities ==
In addition to the six cities (Venice Beach, Kansas City, Houston, Orlando, Pittsburgh, and San Pedro (Military)), the national finals were once again held in Las Vegas, Nevada.

== Obstacles ==
=== City Qualifying & Finals ===
Event		Obstacles										Finishers
Venice Beach	Qualifying	Quintuple Steps	Mini Silk Slider	Tilting Table	Spin Cycle	Hourglass Drop	Warped Wall	N/A				7
Venice Beach	Finals	Quintuple Steps	Mini Silk Slider	Tilting Table	Spin Cycle	Hourglass Drop	Warped Wall	Salmon Ladder	Rumbling Dice	Clear Climb	Invisible Ladder	1
Kansas City	Qualifying	Quintuple Steps	Big Dipper	Floating Tiles	Modified Ring Toss	Bungee Road	Warped Wall	N/A				38
Kansas City	Finals	Quintuple Steps	Big Dipper	Floating Tiles	Modified Ring Toss	Bungee Road	Warped Wall	Salmon Ladder	Flying Shelf Grab	Body Prop	Invisible Ladder	3
Houston	Qualifying	Quintuple Steps	Tilting Slider	Spinning Log	Cargo Crossing	Swinging Spikes	Warped Wall	N/A				15
Houston	Finals	Quintuple Steps	Tilting Slider	Spinning Log	Cargo Crossing	Swinging Spikes	Warped Wall	Salmon Ladder	Walking Bar	Crazy Cliffhanger	Invisible Ladder	2
Orlando	Qualifying	Quintuple Steps	Rolling Log	Paddle Boards	Tire Swing	Double Tilt Ladder	Warped Wall	N/A				25
Orlando	Finals	Quintuple Steps	Rolling Log	Paddle Boards	Tire Swing	Double Tilt Ladder	Warped Wall	Salmon Ladder	Cannonball Alley	Double Helix	Invisible Ladder	2
Pittsburgh	Qualifying	Quintuple Steps	Log Grip	Snake Crossing	Wind Chimes	Devil Steps	Warped Wall	N/A				22
Pittsburgh	Finals	Quintuple Steps	Log Grip	Snake Crossing	Wind Chimes	Devil Steps	Warped Wall	Salmon Ladder	Floating Monkey Bars	Doorknob Arch	Invisible Ladder	2
San Pedro (Military)	Qualifying	Quintuple Steps	Jump Hang	Log Runner	Monkey Pegs	I-Beam Cross	Warped Wall	N/A				10
San Pedro (Military)	Finals	Quintuple Steps	Jump Hang	Log Runner	Monkey Pegs	I-Beam Cross	Warped Wall	Salmon Ladder	Swinging Frames	Globe Grasper	Invisible Ladder	1

=== National Finals ===
Event	Obstacle(s)								Finishers
Stage 1	Piston Road	Propeller Bar	Silk Slider	Jumping Spider	Sonic Curve	Warped Wall	Coin Flip	Triple Swing	38
Stage 2	Rope Jungle	Double Salmon Ladder	Unstable Bridge	Butterfly Wall	Roulette Row	Wall Lift			8
Stage 3	Psycho Chainsaw	Doorknob Grasper	Floating Boards	Ultimate Cliffhanger	Pole Grasper	Hang Climb	Area 51	Flying Bar	2
Stage 4	Rope Climb								2

== City Qualifying ==
=== Venice Beach Qualifying ===
Rank	Finalist	Outcome	Obstacle/Time
1	Kevin Bull	Completed	0:56.40 (POM Wonderful Run of the Night)
2	Alan Connealy	Completed	1:28.32
3	Nicholas Coolridge	Completed	1:29.49
4	Alvaro Campos	Completed	1:46.32
5	Travis Brewer	Completed	2:07.63
6	Grant McCartney	Completed	2:35.53
7	Almas Meirmanov	Completed	2:36.16
8	Sam Goldstein	DQ	Hourglass Drop (0:19.68)
9	David Campbell	DQ	Hourglass Drop (0:22.78)
10	Michael Skiba	Failed	Hourglass Drop (0:29.30)
11	Jason Tirado	Failed	Hourglass Drop (0:31.77)
12	Dustin Rocho	Failed	Hourglass Drop (0:34.51)
13	Johnnie Ho	Failed	Hourglass Drop (0:36.27)
14	Michael Burkett-Crist	Failed	Hourglass Drop (0:37.08)
15	Heath Burian	Failed	Hourglass Drop (0:37.22)
16	Theo Agu	Failed	Hourglass Drop (0:37.45)
17	Matthew Dodd	Failed	Hourglass Drop (0:41.06)
18	Shane Hernandez	Failed	Hourglass Drop (0:46.07)
19	Travis Weinand	Failed	Hourglass Drop (0:46.48)
20	Aveo Torre	Failed	Hourglass Drop (0:48.21)
21	Guy Catz	Failed	Hourglass Drop (0:51.33)
22	Ben Melick	DQ	Hourglass Drop (0:55.05)
23	Nir Halfon	Failed	Hourglass Drop (1:00.43)
24	Rashad Richardson	DQ	Hourglass Drop (1:07.89)
25	Jackson Meyer	Failed	Hourglass Drop (1:13.58)
26	Paul Mangasarian	Failed	Hourglass Drop (1:13.68)
27	Ryan Robinson	DQ	Hourglass Drop (1:17.72)
28	Jessie Graff	Failed	Hourglass Drop (1:19.22)
29	Everest Ling	Failed	Hourglass Drop (1:20.28)
30	Arnold Hernandez	DQ	Hourglass Drop (1:21.46)

=== Kansas City Qualifying ===
Rank	Finalist	Outcome	Obstacle/Time
1	Lorin Ball	Completed	0:58.34
2	Paul Kasemir	Completed	1:03.07
3	Zac Eddington	Completed	1:17.10
4	Lance Pekus	Completed	1:21.69
5	Jake Murray	Completed	1:22.37
6	Kevin Hogan	Completed	1:23.65
7	TJ Sanderson	Completed	1:36.02
8	Dan Yager	Completed	1:41.03
9	Josh Cook	Completed	1:42.65
10	Alan Adams	Completed	1:44.50
11	Isaac Caldiero	Completed	1:53.42
12	Dan Banura	Completed	1:55.34
13	Brandon Berrett	Completed	1:57.56
14	Jason Williams	Completed	2:03.56
15	Michael Silenzi	Completed	2:06.25
16	Brandon Mears	Completed	2:09.27
17	Spenser Mestel	Completed	2:09.46
18	James Fenby	Completed	2:12.99
19	Brian Beckstrand	Completed	2:14.41
20	Dan Polizzi	Completed	2:17.88
21	Ethan Swanson	Completed	2:17.99
22	Karson Voiles	Completed	2:18.28
23	Dave Cavanagh	Completed	2:23.64
24	Mike McKenzie	Completed	2:25.81
25	Christopher Lange	Completed	2:38.49
26	Ian Dory	Completed	2:40.23
27	Michael Stanger	Completed	2:40.30
28	Dan Holguin	Completed	2:44.27
29	Dennis Lappin	Completed	2:48.35
30	Tavares Chambliss	Completed	2:49.95
31	Brian Arnold	Completed	2:51.75
32	Jon Stewart	Completed	2:57.01
33	Robert Taylor	Completed	2:57.72
34	Lutalo Sephers	Completed	3:02.43
35	Brendan Couvreux	Completed	3:07.23
36	Noah Kaufman	Completed	3:35.61
37	Meagan Martin	Completed	4:00.34 (POM Wonderful Run of the Night)
38	Gabe Blomgren	Completed	4:26.20

=== Houston Qualifying ===
Rank	Finalist	Outcome	Obstacle/Time
1	Daniel Gil	Completed	1:30.78 (POM Wonderful Run of the Night)
2	Brent Steffensen	Completed	1:49.96
3	Thomas Stillings	Completed	2:20.57
4	Dillon Gates	Completed	2:20.81
5	Geoff Lancaster	Completed	2:21.59
6	Andrew Lowes	Completed	2:36.71
7	Tremayne Dortch	Completed	2:51.55
8	Abel Gonzalez	Completed	3:03.72
9	Nathan Jasso	Completed	3:06.17
10	Ryan McCoy	Completed	3:07.16
11	Sam Sann	Completed	3:10.43
12	Joe Calderon	Completed	3:17.27
13	Jon Horton	Completed	3:30.32
14	Tony Matesi	Completed	3:40.06
15	Jonathan Parr	Completed	4:25.60
16	Jeremiah Morgan	Failed	Swinging Spikes (0:52.58)
17	Joshua Grant	Failed	Swinging Spikes (0:59.61)
18	Anthony Scott	Failed	Swinging Spikes (1:06.05)
19	Evan Dollard	Failed	Swinging Spikes (1:24.52)
20	Travis Iverson	Failed	Swinging Spikes (1:25.57)
21	Brock Riebe	Failed	Swinging Spikes (1:26.62)
22	Karsten Williams	Failed	Swinging Spikes (1:27.47)
23	Kevin Klein	Failed	Swinging Spikes (1:28.34)
24	Vance Yarter	Failed	Swinging Spikes (1:28.47)
25	Clayton Coufal	Failed	Swinging Spikes (1:28.48)
26	Robert Ing	Failed	Swinging Spikes (1:28.96)
27	Tyler Fisher	Failed	Swinging Spikes (1:31.32)
28	Darren Fagan	Failed	Swinging Spikes (1:33.28)
29	David Yarter	Failed	Swinging Spikes (1:38.73)
30	Christopher Janes	Failed	Swinging Spikes (1:41.94)

=== Orlando Qualifying ===
Rank	Finalist	Outcome	Obstacle/Time
1	Jon Alexis Jr.	Completed	1:37.75
2	James McGrath	Completed	2:00.99
3	Flip Rodriguez	Completed	2:09.45 (POM Wonderful Run of the Night)
4	Travis Rosen	Completed	2:12.23
5	Cory Cook	Completed	2:19.91
6	Neil Craver	Completed	2:22.72
7	Drew Drechsel	Completed	2:29.14
8	JJ Woods	Completed	2:33.85
9	Adam Arnold	Completed	2:43.17
10	Hunter Sipes	Completed	2:50.30
11	Kenneth Niemitalo	Completed	3:12.08
12	Rich Shoemaker	Completed	3:21.35
13	Jo Jo Bynum	Completed	3:24.72
14	Solomon Harvey	Completed	3:36.13
15	Eddy Stewart	Completed	3:45.29
16	Reko Rivera	Completed	3:48.20
17	James Bogle Jr.	Completed	3:48.77
18	Luis Alemany	Completed	3:55.91
19	Stephens Nunnally	Completed	4:06.55
20	Chad Hohn	Completed	4:09.23
21	Gordon White	Completed	4:16.95
22	Alexio Gomes	Completed	4:19.51
23	Matt Jordan	Completed	4:21.05
24	Adam Williams	Completed	4:33.06
25	Shaun Murray	Completed	4:33.79
26	Kyle Johnson	Failed	Warped Wall (2:08.59)
27	Sean Clayton	Failed	Double Tilt Ladder (1:22.70)
28	Matthew Schumann	Failed	Double Tilt Ladder (1:30.25)
29	Idoko Abuh	Failed	Double Tilt Ladder (1:32.44)
30	Jesus Fernandez	Failed	Double Tilt Ladder (1:49.79)

=== Pittsburgh Qualifying ===
Rank	Finalist	Outcome	Obstacle/Time
1	Elet Hall	Completed	1:22.71 (POM Wonderful Run of the Night)
2	Joe Moravsky	Completed	1:34.17
3	Dustin Sanderson	Completed	1:46.54
4	Justin Kydd	Completed	2:10.42
5	Mike Meyers	Completed	2:34.53
6	Luciano Acuna Jr.	Completed	2:40.04
7	Danny Johnson	Completed	2:41.78
8	Pavel Fesyuk	Completed	3:01.38
9	Adam Grossman	Completed	3:03.37
10	Brian Wilczewski	Completed	3:20.54
11	P.J. Granger	Completed	3:31.90
12	Geoff Britten	Completed	3:41.81
13	Adam Mihm	Completed	3:44.64
14	Alex D'Aquila	Completed	3:45.16
15	Ron Schmidt	Completed	4:10.45
16	Joe Archambault	Completed	4:15.64
17	Mike Bernardo	Completed	4:25.15
18	Jazon Khazi	Completed	4:33.23
19	Kelly Mohler	Completed	4:41.68
20	Todd Mitchell	Completed	4:51.54
21	Sean Darling-Hammond	Completed	5:32.64
22	Jamie Rahn	Completed	6:06.95
23	Miles Avery	Failed	Warped Wall (3:01.63)
24	Chad Sanderson	Failed	Devil Steps (1:14.00)
25	David Bozak	Failed	Devil Steps (1:40.04)
26	Tim Mitroka	Failed	Devil Steps (2:14.36)
27	Aaron Himelright	Failed	Devil Steps (2:15.58)
28	Ryan Ripley	Failed	Devil Steps (2:15.73)
29	Michelle Warnky	Failed	Devil Steps (2:42.73)
30	Scott Maxson	Failed	Devil Steps (2:44.24)

=== San Pedro (Military) Qualifying ===
Rank	Finalist	Outcome	Obstacle/Time
1	Robin Pietschmann	Completed	3:05.51 (POM Wonderful Run of the Night)
2	Caleb Hayre	Completed	3:14.85
3	Seth Caskey	Completed	3:26.67
4	Ahmed Toure	Completed	3:44.53
5	Matthew Jensen	Completed	3:46.35
6	Joel Blair	Completed	3:52.69
7	Steve Martin	Completed	4:14.70
8	Van Tran	Completed	4:20.75
9	Ryan Stratis	Completed	4:25.65
10	Dustin McKinney	Completed	5:11.97
11	Nathan Tucker	Failed	I-Beam Cross (1:18.90)
12	Arnold Dinh	Failed	I-Beam Cross (1:30.83)
13	Casey Thornton	Failed	I-Beam Cross (1:37.88)
14	Justin Gielski	Failed	I-Beam Cross (1:54.74)
15	Jason Cantu	Failed	I-Beam Cross (2:02.06)
16	Preston Griffall	Failed	I-Beam Cross (2:04.48)
17	Randall Forsythe	Failed	I-Beam Cross (2:11.25)
18	Jeremy Prather	Failed	I-Beam Cross (2:14.46)
19	Omar Payton	Failed	I-Beam Cross (2:23.41)
20	Deon Graham	Failed	I-Beam Cross (2:24.09)
21	Benjamin Barrett	Failed	I-Beam Cross (2:28.33)
22	Kyle Durand	Failed	I-Beam Cross (2:29.53)
23	Jeremy Guarino	Failed	I-Beam Cross (2:31.76)
24	Christopher Moore	Failed	I-Beam Cross (2:41.57)
25	Trevor Parks	Failed	I-Beam Cross (3:16.13)
26	Darren Virgo	Failed	I-Beam Cross (3:25.69)
27	Joel Burkhalter	Failed	Monkey Pegs (0:49.34)
28	Vincent Klapper	Failed	Monkey Pegs (0:50.73)
29	Dean Mosier	Failed	Monkey Pegs (0:51.71)
30	Alexander Panyasiri	Failed	Monkey Pegs (0:53.15)

=== City Qualifying Leaderboard ===
Rank	Finalist	Outcome	Obstacle/Time
1	Kevin Bull	Completed	0:56.40
2	Lorin Ball	Completed	0:58.34
3	Paul Kasemir	Completed	1:03.07
4	Zac Eddington	Completed	1:17.10
5	Lance Pekus	Completed	1:21.69
6	Jake Murray	Completed	1:22.37
7	Elet Hall	Completed	1:22.71
8	Kevin Hogan	Completed	1:23.65
9	Alan Connealy	Completed	1:28.32
10	Nicholas Coolridge	Completed	1:29.49
11	Daniel Gil	Completed	1:30.78
12	Joe Moravsky	Completed	1:34.17
13	TJ Sanderson	Completed	1:36.02
14	Jon Alexis Jr.	Completed	1:37.75
15	Dan Yager	Completed	1:41.03
16	Josh Cook	Completed	1:42.65
17	Alan Adams	Completed	1:44.50
18	Alvaro Campos	Completed	1:46.32
19	Dustin Sanderson	Completed	1:46.54
20	Brent Steffensen	Completed	1:49.96
21	Isaac Caldiero	Completed	1:53.42
22	Dan Banura	Completed	1:55.34
23	Brandon Berrett	Completed	1:57.56
24	James McGrath	Completed	2:00.99
25	Jason Williams	Completed	2:03.56
26	Michael Silenzi	Completed	2:06.25
27	Travis Brewer	Completed	2:07.63
28	Brandon Mears	Completed	2:09.27
29	Flip Rodriguez	Completed	2:09.45
30	Spenser Mestel	Completed	2:09.46
31	Justin Kydd	Completed	2:10.42
32	Travis Rosen	Completed	2:12.23
33	James Fenby	Completed	2:12.99
34	Brian Beckstrand	Completed	2:14.41
35	Dan Polizzi	Completed	2:17.88
36	Ethan Swanson	Completed	2:17.99
37	Karson Voiles	Completed	2:18.28
38	Cory Cook	Completed	2:19.91
39	Thomas Stillings	Completed	2:20.57
40	Dillon Gates	Completed	2:20.81
41	Geoff Lancaster	Completed	2:21.59
42	Neil Craver	Completed	2:22.72
43	Dave Cavanagh	Completed	2:23.64
44	Mike McKenzie	Completed	2:25.81
45	Drew Drechsel	Completed	2:29.14
46	JJ Woods	Completed	2:33.85
47	Mike Meyers	Completed	2:34.53
48	Grant McCartney	Completed	2:35.53
49	Almas Meirmanov	Completed	2:36.16
50	Andrew Lowes	Completed	2:36.71
51	Christopher Lange	Completed	2:38.49
52	Luciano Acuna Jr.	Completed	2:40.04
53	Ian Dory	Completed	2:40.23
54	Michael Stanger	Completed	2:40.30
55	Danny Johnson	Completed	2:41.78
56	Adam Arnold	Completed	2:43.17
57	Dan Holguin	Completed	2:44.27
58	Dennis Lappin	Completed	2:48.35
59	Tavares Chambliss	Completed	2:49.95
60	Hunter Sipes	Completed	2:50.30
61	Tremayne Dortch	Completed	2:51.55
62	Brian Arnold	Completed	2:51.75
63	Jon Stewart	Completed	2:57.01
64	Robert Taylor	Completed	2:57.72
65	Pavel Fesyuk	Completed	3:01.38
66	Lutalo Sephers	Completed	3:02.43
67	Adam Grossman	Completed	3:03.37
68	Abel Gonzalez	Completed	3:03.72
69	Robin Pietschmann	Completed	3:05.51
70	Nathan Jasso	Completed	3:06.17
71	Ryan McCoy	Completed	3:07.16
72	Brendan Couvreux	Completed	3:07.23
73	Sam Sann	Completed	3:10.43
74	Kenneth Niemitalo	Completed	3:12.08
75	Caleb Hayre	Completed	3:14.85
76	Joe Calderon	Completed	3:17.27
77	Brian Wilczewski	Completed	3:20.54
78	Rich Shoemaker	Completed	3:21.35
79	Jo Jo Bynum	Completed	3:24.72
80	Seth Caskey	Completed	3:26.67
81	Jon Horton	Completed	3:30.32
82	P.J. Granger	Completed	3:31.90
83	Noah Kaufman	Completed	3:35.61
84	Solomon Harvey	Completed	3:36.13
85	Tony Matesi	Completed	3:40.06
86	Geoff Britten	Completed	3:41.81
87	Ahmed Toure	Completed	3:44.53
88	Adam Mihm	Completed	3:44.64
89	Alex D'Aquila	Completed	3:45.16
90	Eddy Stewart	Completed	3:45.29
91	Matthew Jensen	Completed	3:46.35
92	Reko Rivera	Completed	3:48.20
93	James Bogle Jr.	Completed	3:48.77
94	Joel Blair	Completed	3:52.69
95	Luis Alemany	Completed	3:55.91
96	Meagan Martin	Completed	4:00.34
97	Stephens Nunnally	Completed	4:06.55
98	Chad Hohn	Completed	4:09.23
99	Ron Schmidt	Completed	4:10.45
100	Steve Martin	Completed	4:14.70
101	Joe Archambault	Completed	4:15.64
102	Gordon White	Completed	4:16.95
103	Alexio Gomes	Completed	4:19.51
104	Van Tran	Completed	4:20.75
105	Matt Jordan	Completed	4:21.05
106	Mike Bernardo	Completed	4:25.15
107	Jonathan Parr	Completed	4:25.60
108	Ryan Stratis	Completed	4:25.65
109	Gabe Blomgren	Completed	4:26.20
110	Adam Williams	Completed	4:33.06
111	Jazon Khazi	Completed	4:33.23
112	Shaun Murray	Completed	4:33.79
113	Kelly Mohler	Completed	4:41.68
114	Todd Mitchell	Completed	4:51.54
115	Dustin McKinney	Completed	5:11.97
116	Sean Darling-Hammond	Completed	5:32.64
117	Jamie Rahn	Completed	6:06.95
118	Kyle Johnson	Failed	Warped Wall (2:08.59)
119	Miles Avery	Failed	Warped Wall (3:01.63)
120	Sam Goldstein	DQ	Hourglass Drop (0:19.68)
121	David Campbell	DQ	Hourglass Drop (0:22.78)
122	Michael Skiba	Failed	Hourglass Drop (0:29.30)
123	Jason Tirado	Failed	Hourglass Drop (0:31.77)
124	Dustin Rocho	Failed	Hourglass Drop (0:34.51)
125	Johnnie Ho	Failed	Hourglass Drop (0:36.27)
126	Michael Burkett-Crist	Failed	Hourglass Drop (0:37.08)
127	Heath Burian	Failed	Hourglass Drop (0:37.22)
128	Theo Agu	Failed	Hourglass Drop (0:37.45)
129	Matthew Dodd	Failed	Hourglass Drop (0:41.06)
130	Shane Hernandez	Failed	Hourglass Drop (0:46.07)
131	Travis Weinand	Failed	Hourglass Drop (0:46.48)
132	Aveo Torre	Failed	Hourglass Drop (0:48.21)
133	Guy Catz	Failed	Hourglass Drop (0:51.33)
134	Jeremiah Morgan	Failed	Swinging Spikes (0:52.58)
135	Ben Melick	DQ	Hourglass Drop (0:55.05)
136	Joshua Grant	Failed	Swinging Spikes (0:59.61)
137	Nir Halfon	Failed	Hourglass Drop (1:00.43)
138	Anthony Scott	Failed	Swinging Spikes (1:06.05)
139	Rashad Richardson	DQ	Hourglass Drop (1:07.89)
140	Jackson Meyer	Failed	Hourglass Drop (1:13.58)
141	Paul Mangasarian	Failed	Hourglass Drop (1:13.68)
142	Chad Sanderson	Failed	Devil Steps (1:14.00)
143	Ryan Robinson	DQ	Hourglass Drop (1:17.72)
144	Nathan Tucker	Failed	I-Beam Cross (1:18.90)
145	Jessie Graff	Failed	Hourglass Drop (1:19.22)
146	Everest Ling	Failed	Hourglass Drop (1:20.28)
147	Arnold Hernandez	DQ	Hourglass Drop (1:21.46)
148	Sean Clayton	Failed	Double Tilt Ladder (1:22.70)
149	Evan Dollard	Failed	Swinging Spikes (1:24.52)
150	Travis Iverson	Failed	Swinging Spikes (1:25.57)
151	Brock Riebe	Failed	Swinging Spikes (1:26.62)
152	Karsten Williams	Failed	Swinging Spikes (1:27.47)
153	Kevin Klein	Failed	Swinging Spikes (1:28.34)
154	Vance Yarter	Failed	Swinging Spikes (1:28.47)
155	Clayton Coufal	Failed	Swinging Spikes (1:28.48)
156	Robert Ing	Failed	Swinging Spikes (1:28.96)
157	Matthew Schumann	Failed	Double Tilt Ladder (1:30.25)
158	Arnold Dinh	Failed	I-Beam Cross (1:30.83)
159	Tyler Fisher	Failed	Swinging Spikes (1:31.32)
160	Idoko Abuh	Failed	Double Tilt Ladder (1:32.44)
161	Darren Fagan	Failed	Swinging Spikes (1:33.28)
162	Casey Thornton	Failed	I-Beam Cross (1:37.88)
163	David Yarter	Failed	Swinging Spikes (1:38.73)
164	David Bozak	Failed	Devil Steps (1:40.04)
165	Christopher Janes	Failed	Swinging Spikes (1:41.94)
166	Jesus Fernandez	Failed	Double Tilt Ladder (1:49.79)
167	Justin Gielski	Failed	I-Beam Cross (1:54.74)
168	Jason Cantu	Failed	I-Beam Cross (2:02.06)
169	Preston Griffall	Failed	I-Beam Cross (2:04.48)
170	Randall Forsythe	Failed	I-Beam Cross (2:11.25)
171	Tim Mitroka	Failed	Devil Steps (2:14.36)
172	Jeremy Prather	Failed	I-Beam Cross (2:14.46)
173	Aaron Himelright	Failed	Devil Steps (2:15.58)
174	Ryan Ripley	Failed	Devil Steps (2:15.73)
175	Omar Payton	Failed	I-Beam Cross (2:23.41)
176	Deon Graham	Failed	I-Beam Cross (2:24.09)
177	Benjamin Barrett	Failed	I-Beam Cross (2:28.33)
178	Kyle Durand	Failed	I-Beam Cross (2:29.53)
179	Jeremy Guarino	Failed	I-Beam Cross (2:31.76)
180	Christopher Moore	Failed	I-Beam Cross (2:41.57)
181	Michelle Warnky	Failed	Devil Steps (2:42.73)
182	Scott Maxson	Failed	Devil Steps (2:44.24)
183	Trevor Parks	Failed	I-Beam Cross (3:16.13)
184	Darren Virgo	Failed	I-Beam Cross (3:25.69)
185	Joel Burkhalter	Failed	Monkey Pegs (0:49.34)
186	Vincent Klapper	Failed	Monkey Pegs (0:50.73)
187	Dean Mosier	Failed	Monkey Pegs (0:51.71)
188	Alexander Panyasiri	Failed	Monkey Pegs (0:53.15)

=== Fastest Qualifiers ===
Kevin Bull had the fastest time on a City Qualifying course this season.

City	Fastest Finisher	Time
Venice Beach	Kevin Bull	0:56.40
Kansas City	Lorin Ball	0:58.34
Houston	Daniel Gil	1:30.78
Orlando	Jon Alexis Jr.	1:37.75
Pittsburgh	Elet Hall	1:22.71
San Pedro (Military)	Robin Pietschmann	3:05.51

== City Finals ==
=== Venice Beach Finals ===
Competitors who advanced to the Vegas Finals are listed below. Obstacles used in the Venice Beach Finals included:

Rank	Finalist	Outcome	Obstacle/Time
1	Nicholas Coolridge	Completed	6:06.39 (POM Wonderful Run of the Night)
2	Kevin Bull	Failed	Invisible Ladder (4:45.38)
3	David Campbell	Failed	Invisible Ladder (4:48.50)
4	Alvaro Campos	Failed	Clear Climb (3:07.90)
5	Grant McCartney	Failed	Clear Climb (3:27.53)
6	Jessie Graff	Failed	Clear Climb (4:40.27)
7	Dustin Rocho	Failed	Double Rumbling Dice (2:00.68)
8	Ben Melick	Failed	Double Rumbling Dice (2:26.48)
9	Ryan Robinson	Failed	Double Rumbling Dice (2:55.57)
10	Almas Meirmanov	Failed	Salmon Ladder (1:38.53)
11	Jason Tirado	Failed	Hourglass Drop (0:24.66)
12	Sam Goldstein	DQ	Hourglass Drop (0:25.75)
13	Michael Burkett-Crist	Failed	Hourglass Drop (0:27.11)
14	Azeo Torre	Failed	Hourglass Drop (0:30.34)
15	Theo Agu	Failed	Hourglass Drop (0:30.91)

Notes

- Nicholas Coolridge was the only person to clear the course as the "POM Run of the Night".
- Many people went out on the Hourglass Drop, meaning that most people had to only clear the 5th Obstacle to make it to Vegas, and did not even need to pass all the standard qualifying course obstacles; the only other time this has occurred was during Season 4 during the Northeast Region Finals and that was the last season we saw it as a fifth qualifying obstacle next it became an eighth obstacle after the Salmon Ladder still a ninja killer for American Ninja Warrior Season 8 and 9.
- Jessie Graff is only the 4th woman to scale the Warped Wall, and the second to make it to Las Vegas directly (and is the only one to make it this season directly). Graff is also the second woman to clear the Salmon Ladder. Graff is only the second woman to clear the Salmon Ladder, behind Kacy Catanzaro in ANW 6.

=== Kansas City Finals ===
Competitors who advanced to the Vegas Finals are listed below. A small rainstorm had passed over earlier, causing some obstacles to be slightly wet and slick. Obstacles used in the Kansas City Finals included:

Rank	Finalist	Outcome	Obstacle/Time
1	Lance Pekus	Completed	5:38.44 (POM Wonderful Run of the Night)
2	Ian Dory	Completed	6:44.51
3	Brendan Couvreux	Completed	8:14.84
4	Isaac Caldiero	Failed	Body Prop (2:29.74)
5	Josh Cook	Failed	Body Prop (2:37.03)
6	Brandon Berrett	Failed	Body Prop (2:41.17)
7	Lorin Ball	Failed	Body Prop (2:49.47)
8	Paul Kasemir	Failed	Body Prop (3:11.78)
9	Brandon Mears	Failed	Body Prop (3:12.54)
10	Jake Murray	Failed	Body Prop (3:15.28)
11	Karson Voiles	Failed	Body Prop (3:45.02)
12	Brian Arnold	Failed	Body Prop (3:45.82)
13	Jason Williams	Failed	Body Prop (3:50.90)
14	Dan Yager	Failed	Body Prop (4:03.15)
15	Dennis Lappin	Failed	Body Prop (4:04.90)

Notes

- Meagan Martin was the only female in the finals, but she fell on the second obstacle and placed last in the finals. However, she still became a wildcard for Vegas.
- Kansas City had the most finishers on any city finals course this year with 3.

=== Houston Finals ===
Competitors who advanced to the Vegas Finals are listed below. Obstacles in the Houston Finals included:

Rank	Finalist	Outcome	Obstacle/Time
1	Jeremiah Morgan	Completed	6:16.68
2	Sam Sann	Completed	8:43.39 (POM Wonderful Run of the Night)
3	Daniel Gil	Failed	Crazy Cliffhanger (2:43.39)
4	Karsten Williams	Failed	Crazy Cliffhanger (4:43.31)
5	Tremayne Dortch	Failed	Crazy Cliffhanger (5:39.16)
6	Thomas Stillings	Failed	Walking Bar (2:32.97)
7	Geoff Lancaster	Failed	Walking Bar (2:48.28)
8	Brent Steffensen	Failed	Walking Bar (2:51.02)
9	David Yarter	Failed	Walking Bar (3:12.48)
10	Dillon Gates	Failed	Walking Bar (3:27.80)
11	Kevin Klein	Failed	Walking Bar (3:51.73)
12	Abel Gonzalez	Failed	Walking Bar (4:32.37)
13	Joe Calderon	Failed	Walking Bar (5:12.87)
14	Anthony Scott	Failed	Walking Bar (6:03.94)
15	Jonathan Parr	Failed	Walking Bar (6:21.12)

Notes

- Jeremiah Morgan and Sam Sann were the only 2 finishers of the course.
- Sam Sann is the 2nd oldest person to finish a City Finals Course at 48 years old, after Jon Stewart.
- The Walking Bar proved to be the most difficult obstacle during the course.

=== Orlando Finals ===
Competitors who advanced to the Vegas Finals are listed below. Obstacles used during the Orlando Finals are listed below.

Rank	Finalist	Outcome	Obstacle/Time
1	James McGrath	Completed	5:30.50 (POM Wonderful Run of the Night)
2	Adam Arnold	Completed	6:42.07
3	Flip Rodriguez	Failed	Invisible Ladder (5:12.24)
4	Drew Drechsel	Failed	Invisible Ladder (5:25.18)
5	Neil Craver	Failed	Invisible Ladder (5:33.33)
6	Travis Rosen	Failed	Double Helix (3:06.12)
7	Gordon White	Failed	Double Helix (5:35.18)
8	JJ Woods	Failed	Cannonball Alley (3:31.12)
9	Sean Clayton	Failed	Cannonball Alley (4:12.90)
10	James Bogle Jr.	Failed	Cannonball Alley (4:19.01)
11	Hunter Sipes	Failed	Cannonball Alley (4:29.87)
12	Eddy Stewart	Failed	Cannonball Alley (4:50.62)
13	Rich Shoemaker	Failed	Cannonball Alley (4:59.36)
14	Jo Jo Bynum	Failed	Cannonball Alley (5:10.85)
15	Alexio Gomes	Failed	Cannonball Alley (5:15.98)

Notes

- Adam Arnold and James McGrath were the only two competitors to complete this course.
- Cannonball Alley eliminated 11 competitors, almost one-third of the competitors. Only 7 out of 18 competitors who made it that far, advanced to the next obstacle.
- The course took place at Universal Studios Orlando.

=== Pittsburgh Finals ===
Competitors who advanced to the Vegas Finals are listed below. Obstacles in the Pittsburgh Finals included:

Rank	Finalist	Outcome	Obstacle/Time
1	Geoff Britten	Completed	6:44.81 (POM Wonderful Run of the Night)
2	Joe Moravsky	Completed	7:28.92
3	Jamie Rahn	Failed	Invisible Ladder (6:47.46)
4	Elet Hall	Failed	Doorknob Arch (2:59.18)
5	Mike Meyers	Failed	Doorknob Arch (3:53.84)
6	Sean Darling-Hammond	Failed	Doorknob Arch (5:05.44)
7	Mike Bernardo	Failed	Doorknob Arch (5:08.59)
8	Adam Mihm	Failed	Floating Monkey Bars (4:17.45)
9	Brian Wilczewski	Failed	Floating Monkey Bars (4:20.25)
10	Pavel Fesyuk	Failed	Floating Monkey Bars (4:24.06)
11	Adam Grossman	Failed	Floating Monkey Bars (4:29.12)
12	P.J. Granger	Failed	Floating Monkey Bars (4:37.30)
13	Aaron Himelright	Failed	Floating Monkey Bars (4:44.74)
14	Todd Mitchell	Failed	Floating Monkey Bars (4:47.34)
15	Ron Schmidt	Failed	Floating Monkey Bars (4:55.89)

Notes

- Joe Moravsky and Geoff Britten were the only two finishers.
- Michelle Warnky was the only female in the Pittsburgh Finals, but failed on Snake Crossing. However, she was wild-carded to the Las Vegas National Finals.
- Miles Avery was the oldest man ever to make a City Finals but failed on Snake Crossing as well.

=== San Pedro (Military) Finals ===
Military competitors who advanced to the Vegas Finals are listed below. Obstacles in the San Pedro Finals included:

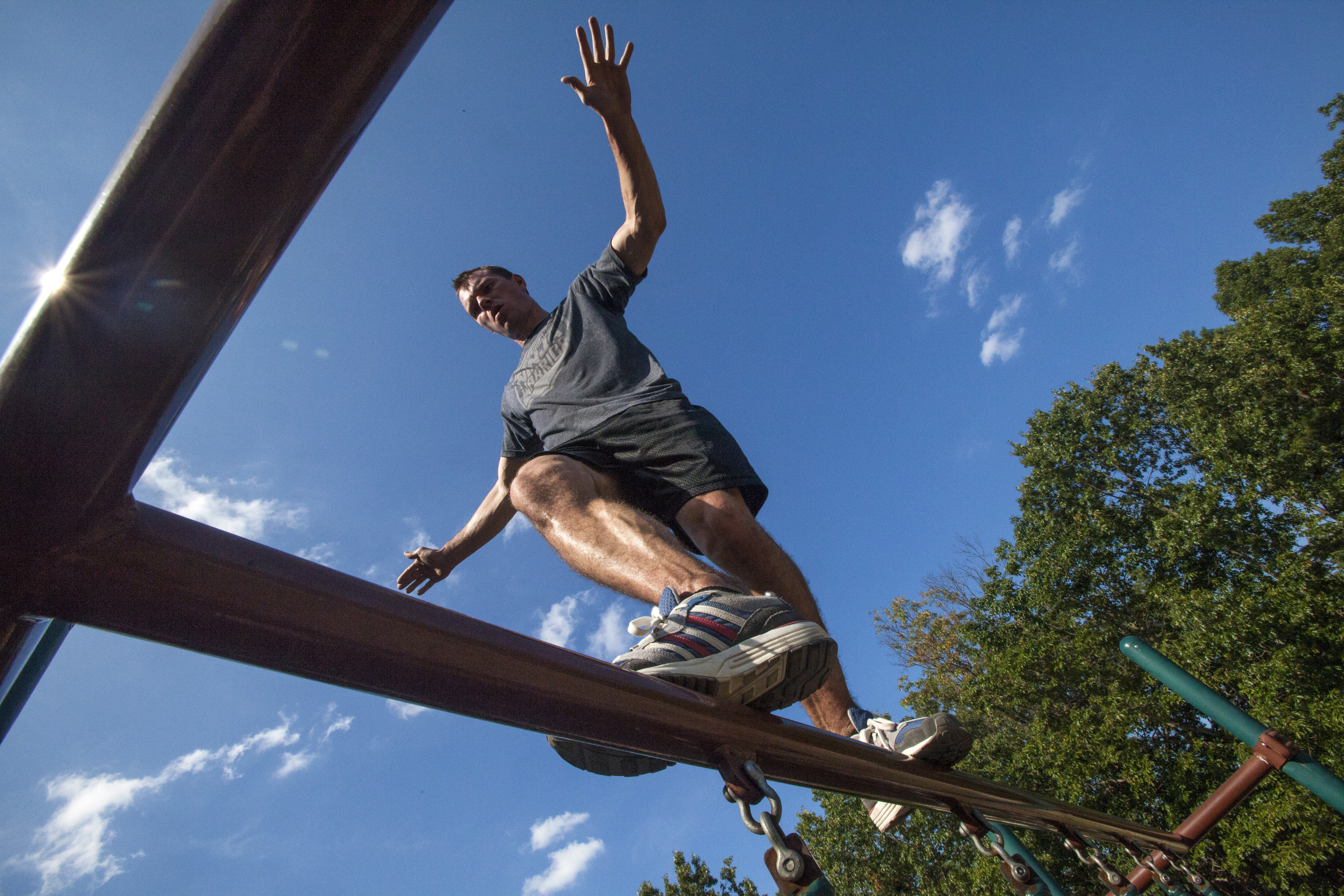
Fifth-place finisher Tech. Sgt. Justin B. Gielski, of the New Jersey Air National Guard, doing Ninja training in his home state

Rank	Finalist	Outcome	Obstacle/Time
1	Dustin McKinney	Completed	9:48.75 (POM Wonderful Run of the Night)
2	Matthew Jensen	Failed	Invisible Ladder (8:34.65)
3	Ryan Stratis	Failed	Invisible Ladder (8:43.93)
4	Robin Pietschmann	Failed	Globe Grasper (4:05.89)
5	Justin Gielski	Failed	Globe Grasper (4:47.34)
6	Ahmed Toure	Failed	Globe Grasper (5:01.26)
7	Jeremy Prather	Failed	Globe Grasper (5:40.29)
8	Christopher Moore	Failed	Swinging Frames (5:27.55)
9	Jeremy Guarino	Failed	Swinging Frames (5:36.35)
10	Van Tran	Failed	Swinging Frames (5:58.93)
11	Steve Martin	Failed	Swinging Frames (6:56.35)
12	Caleb Hayre	Failed	Salmon Ladder (3:06.65)
13	Preston Griffall	Failed	Salmon Ladder (3:34.06)
14	Nathan Tucker	Failed	Salmon Ladder (3:58.86)
15	Benjamin Barrett	Failed	Salmon Ladder (6:07.98)

Notes

- The Finals were held in San Pedro, California with the USS Iowa as a backdrop.
- Dustin McKinney was the only finisher; he is also the shortest man to ever complete a City Finals course.
- Preston Griffall was the first Olympian to advance to Vegas, failing on the Salmon Ladder and placing 13th.

=== City Finals Leaderboard ===
Rank	Finalist	Outcome	Obstacle/Time
1	James McGrath	Completed	5:30.50
2	Lance Pekus	Completed	5:38.44
3	Nicholas Coolridge	Completed	6:06.39
4	Jeremiah Morgan	Completed	6:16.68
5	Adam Arnold	Completed	6:42.07
6	Ian Dory	Completed	6:44.51
7	Geoff Britten	Completed	6:44.81
8	Joe Moravsky	Completed	7:28.92
9	Brendan Couvreux	Completed	8:14.84
10	Sam Sann	Completed	8:43.39
11	Dustin McKinney	Completed	9:48.75
12	Kevin Bull	Failed	Invisible Ladder (4:45.38)
13	David Campbell	Failed	Invisible Ladder (4:48.50)
14	Flip Rodriguez	Failed	Invisible Ladder (5:12.24)
15	Drew Drechsel	Failed	Invisible Ladder (5:25.18)
16	Neil Craver	Failed	Invisible Ladder (5:33.33)
17	Jamie Rahn	Failed	Invisible Ladder (6:47.46)
18	Matthew Jensen	Failed	Invisible Ladder (8:34.65)
19	Ryan Stratis	Failed	Invisible Ladder (8:43.93)
20	Isaac Caldiero	Failed	Body Prop (2:29.74)
21	Josh Cook	Failed	Body Prop (2:37.03)
22	Brandon Berrett	Failed	Body Prop (2:41.17)
23	Daniel Gil	Failed	Crazy Cliffhanger (2:43.39)
24	Lorin Ball	Failed	Body Prop (2:49.47)
25	Elet Hall	Failed	Doorknob Arch (2:59.18)
26	Travis Rosen	Failed	Double Helix (3:06.12)
27	Alvaro Campos	Failed	Clear Climb (3:07.90)
28	Paul Kasemir	Failed	Body Prop (3:11.78)
29	Brandon Mears	Failed	Body Prop (3:12.54)
30	Jake Murray	Failed	Body Prop (3:15.28)
31	Grant McCartney	Failed	Clear Climb (3:27.53)
32	Karson Voiles	Failed	Body Prop (3:45.02)
33	Brian Arnold	Failed	Body Prop (3:45.82)
34	Jason Williams	Failed	Body Prop (3:50.90)
35	Mike Meyers	Failed	Doorknob Arch (3:53.84)
36	Dan Yager	Failed	Body Prop (4:03.15)
37	Dennis Lappin	Failed	Body Prop (4:04.90)
38	Robin Pietschmann	Failed	Globe Grasper (4:05.89)
39	Jessie Graff	Failed	Clear Climb (4:40.27)
40	Karsten Williams	Failed	Crazy Cliffhanger (4:43.31)
41	Justin Gielski	Failed	Globe Grasper (4:47.34)
42	Ahmed Toure	Failed	Globe Grasper (5:01.26)
43	Sean Darling-Hammond	Failed	Doorknob Arch (5:05.44)
44	Mike Bernardo	Failed	Doorknob Arch (5:08.59)
45	Gordon White	Failed	Double Helix (5:35.18)
46	Tremayne Dortch	Failed	Crazy Cliffhanger (5:39.16)
47	Jeremy Prather	Failed	Globe Grasper (5:40.29)
48	Dustin Rocho	Failed	Rumbling Dice (2:00.68)
49	Ben Melick	Failed	Rumbling Dice (2:26.48)
50	Thomas Stillings	Failed	Walking Bar (2:32.97)
51	Geoff Lancaster	Failed	Walking Bar (2:48.28)
52	Brent Steffensen	Failed	Walking Bar (2:51.02)
53	Ryan Robinson	Failed	Rumbling Dice (2:55.57)
54	David Yarter	Failed	Walking Bar (3:12.48)
55	Dillon Gates	Failed	Walking Bar (3:27.80)
56	JJ Woods	Failed	Cannonball Alley (3:31.12)
57	Kevin Klein	Failed	Walking Bar (3:51.73)
58	Sean Clayton	Failed	Cannonball Alley (4:12.90
59	Adam Mihm	Failed	Floating Monkey Bars (4:17.45)
60	James Bogle Jr.	Failed	Cannonball Alley (4:19.01)
61	Brian Wilczewski	Failed	Floating Monkey Bars (4:20.25)
62	Pavel Fesyuk	Failed	Floating Monkey Bars (4:24.06)
63	Adam Grossman	Failed	Floating Monkey Bars (4:29.12)
64	Hunter Sipes	Failed	Cannonball Alley (4:29.87)
65	Abel Gonzalez	Failed	Walking Bar (4:32.37)
66	P.J. Granger	Failed	Floating Monkey Bars (4:37.30)
67	Aaron Himelright	Failed	Floating Monkey Bars (4:44.74)
68	Todd Mitchell	Failed	Floating Monkey Bars (4:47.34)
69	Eddy Stewart	Failed	Cannonball Alley (4:50.62)
70	Ron Schmidt	Failed	Floating Monkey Bars (4:55.89)
71	Rich Shoemaker	Failed	Cannonball Alley (4:59.36)
72	Jo Jo Bynum	Failed	Cannonball Alley (5:10.85)
73	Joe Calderon	Failed	Walking Bar (5:12.87)
74	Alexio Gomes	Failed	Cannonball Alley (5:15.98)
75	Christopher Moore	Failed	Swinging Frames (5:27.55)
76	Jeremy Guarino	Failed	Swinging Frames (5:36.35)
77	Van Tran	Failed	Swinging Frames (5:58.93)
78	Anthony Scott	Failed	Walking Bar (6:03.94)
79	Jonathan Parr	Failed	Walking Bar (6:21.12)
80	Steve Martin	Failed	Swinging Frames (6:56.35)
81	Almas Meirmanov	Failed	Salmon Ladder (1:38.53)
82	Caleb Hayre	Failed	Salmon Ladder (3:06.65)
83	Preston Griffall	Failed	Salmon Ladder (3:34.06)
84	Nathan Tucker	Failed	Salmon Ladder (3:58.86)
85	Benjamin Barrett	Failed	Salmon Ladder (6:07.98)
86	Jason Tirado	Failed	Hourglass Drop (0:24.66)
87	Sam Goldstein	DQ	Hourglass Drop (0:25.75)
88	Michael Burkett-Crist	Failed	Hourglass Drop (0:27.11)
89	Azeo Torre	Failed	Hourglass Drop (0:30.34)
90	Theo Agu	Failed	Hourglass Drop (0:30.91)

=== Fastest Finalists ===
James McGrath had the fastest time on a City Finals course this season.

City	Fastest Finisher	Time
Venice Beach	Nicholas Coolridge	6:06.39
Kansas City	Lance Pekus	5:38.44
Houston	Jeremiah Morgan	6:16.68
Orlando	James McGrath	5:30.50
Pittsburgh	Geoff Britten	6:44.81
San Pedro (Military)	Dustin McKinney	9:48.75

== Mount Midoriyama ==
=== Stage 1 ===
Competitors who successfully completed Stage 1 in under 2:30.00 are listed below. Competitors in Bold are finishers of the city finals. Obstacles used in Stage 1 included:

Stage 1 featured three new obstacles, Sonic Curve, the Coin Flip, and the Triple Swing.

Order	Finalist	Outcome	Result
1	Brent Steffensen	Completed	1:38.92 (POM Wonderful Run of the Night, Night 2)
2	Jake Murray	Completed	1:39.78
3	Kevin Bull	Completed	1:40.26 (POM Wonderful Run of the Night, Night 1)
4	Drew Drechsel	Completed	1:49.42
5	Daniel Gil	Completed	1:51.56
6	**Joe Moravsky**	Completed	1:54.69
7	**Jeremiah Morgan**	Completed	1:56.24
8	JJ Woods	Completed	1:57.36
9	Mike Meyers	Completed	2:00.29
10	Flip Rodriguez	Completed	2:01.14
11	Dan Yager	Completed	2:02.50
12	Brian Wilczewski	Completed	2:03.66
13	Travis Rosen	Completed	2:04.14
14	**Geoff Britten**	Completed	2:05.34
15	**Lance Pekus**	Completed	2:06.34
16	Brian Arnold	Completed	2:07.15
17	Neil Craver	Completed	2:07.16
18	Jo Jo Bynum	Completed	2:07.17
19	Sean Clayton	Completed	2:08.36
20	Isaac Caldiero	Completed	2:09.26
21	Jason Williams	Completed	2:09.78
22	Karson Voiles	Completed	2:11.53
23	Mike Bernardo	Completed	2:11.86
24	Thomas Stillings	Completed	2:13.02
25	Abel Gonzalez	Completed	2:14.50
26	Ryan Stratis	Completed	2:15.72
27	Jamie Rahn	Completed	2:17.22
28	Anthony Scott	Completed	2:19.10
29	Brandon Mears	Completed	2:19.52
30	Grant McCartney	Completed	2:20.41
31	**Dustin McKinney**	Completed	2:22.52
32	**Ian Dory**	Completed	2:24.13
33	Nathan Tucker	Completed	2:25.34
34	Kevin Klein	Completed	2:25.44
35	Tremayne Dortch	Completed	2:28.03
36	Pavel Fesyuk	Completed	2:29.01
37	David Yarter	Completed	2:29.48
38	Dustin Rocho	Completed	2:29.53

Notes

- A record of 38 competitors had completed stage 1, beating the record of 24 in season 4. This record would be beaten in season 9, with 41 competitors.
- The Vegas finals had a record 3 finishers (Pavel Fesyuk, David Yarter, and Dustin Rocho) who completed Stage 1 with less than a second left.
- Brent Steffensen had the fastest time on the course by 1:38.92.
- Brandon Mears is the tallest person to complete Stage 1 in ANW history at 6'5 (195.6 cm).
- Dustin McKinney is the shortest person to complete Stage 1 in ANW history at 5'2 (157.5 cm), until Tyler Yamauchi in the show's ninth season.

=== Stage 2 ===
Stage 2 featured a new obstacle, Roulette Row.

Order	Finalist	Result	Notes
1	Geoff Britten	Completed	2:00.89
2	Kevin Bull	Completed	2:01.10
3	Isaac Caldiero	Completed	2:04.80
4	Joe Moravsky	Completed	2:09.59
5	Jeremiah Morgan	Completed	2:11.23
6	Drew Drechsel	Completed	2:12.48
7	Ian Dory	Completed	2:16.03
8	Abel Gonzalez	Completed	2:20.56

Notes

- A record 8 competitors finished Stage 2, but this record would later be beaten in Season 11 when 21 competitors finished the stage.
- Geoff Britten had the fastest finish with a time of 2:00.89.

=== Stage 3 ===
Stage 3 featured two new obstacles, Psycho Chainsaw and Area 51.

Order	Finalist	Result	Notes
1	Isaac Caldiero	Completed	5:13
2	Geoff Britten	Completed	N/A

Notes

- Geoff Britten and Isaac Caldiero were the only two finishers in Stage 3.

=== Stage 4 ===
Isaac Caldiero and Geoff Britten were the first two people to reach Stage 4 in the seventh season of the show. Since there were two competitors, the trophy and $1,000,000 was given to the athlete with the fastest time to climb the tower via a 75-foot rope and hit the buzzer at the top. While Britten was able to hit the buzzer at the top with 0.35 seconds remaining and earn the title of "First American Ninja Warrior", being the first runner-up to achieve Total Victory, Caldiero hit the buzzer with 3.86 seconds left and earned the title of "Second American Ninja Warrior" and the first to win $1,000,000.

Order	Finalist	Outcome	Result
1	Geoff Britten	Total Victory	0:29.65
2	Isaac Caldiero	Total Victory	0:26.14 (POM Wonderful Run of the Night)

== U.S. Nielsen Ratings ==
No. in series	No. in season	Episode	Air date	Rating/Share (18–49)		Viewers (millions)	Time slot rank	Nightly rank	Weekly rank	DVR 18-49	DVR Viewers (millions)	Total 18-49	Total Viewers
88	1	Venice Beach Qualifying	May 25, 2015	1.8	6	5.87	1	1	3	0.3	0.707	2.1	6.57
89	2	Kansas City Qualifying	June 1, 2015	2.0	7	6.86	1	1	4	0.3	0.892	2.3	7.75
90	3	Houston Qualifying	June 8, 2015	2.1	7	6.99	1	1	6	0.4	1.088	2.5	8.10
91	4	Orlando Qualifying	June 22, 2015	1.8	7	5.94	2	2	7	0.3	0.844	2.1	6.78
92	5	Pittsburgh Qualifying	June 29, 2015	1.9	7	6.80	1	1	4	0.5	1.034	2.4	7.84
93	6	San Pedro (Military) Qualifying	July 6, 2015	1.9	7	6.42	2	2	6	0.3	—N/a	2.2	—N/a
94	7	Venice Beach Finals	July 13, 2015	1.8	6	6.06	2	2	8	0.4	0.920	2.2	6.96
95	8	Kansas City Finals	July 20, 2015	2.1	7	6.68	1	1	2	—N/a	0.705	—N/a	7.39
96	9	Houston Finals	July 27, 2015	1.9	7	6.18	2	3	6	0.3	0.790	2.2	6.97
97	10	Orlando Finals	August 3, 2015	1.9	7	6.52	1	1	7	0.3	0.813	2.2	7.33
98	11	Pittsburgh Finals	August 10, 2015	2.1	7	7.19	1	1	3	0.3	0.902	2.4	8.11
99	12	San Pedro (Military) Finals	August 17, 2015	1.9	7	6.81	1	1	5	0.3	0.782	2.2	7.59
100	13	Best Runs of 2015 (Compilation Show)	August 24, 2015	1.3	5	5.07	2	2	10	—N/a	—N/a	—N/a	—N/a
101	14	Vegas Finals (Stage 1)	August 31, 2015	2.1	7	7.32	1	1	3	0.4	1.031	2.5	8.35
102	15	Vegas Finals (Stage 1 continued)	September 7, 2015	1.7	5	6.20	1	1	13	0.3	0.890	2.0	7.09
103	16	Vegas Finals (Stages 2, 3, & 4)	September 14, 2015	2.1	7	6.06	1 (tie)	1 (tie)	10	—N/a	—N/a	—N/a	—N/a
