= Pomegranate Council =

The Pomegranate Council is a non-profit agricultural commodity marketing organization based in Sonoma, California, United States.

Founded in 1997 by California-based international produce marketer Tom Tjerandsen, in association with charter members Simonian Fruit Company and Roll International (the parent company of what would later become POM Wonderful), the Pomegranate Council is a non-profit organization that exists to promote the pomegranate fruit and its variety of uses. Patterned after the successful Apricot Council, the Pomegranate Council's activities range from consumer-awareness programs to developing and distributing tools for use by pomegranate producers. The council has been credited with contributing to the recent marked increase in consumption and awareness of pomegranates and pomegranate products.

The Pomegranate Council provides a variety of non-branded commodity marketing support, including press relations, distribution of printed material such as point-of-sale usage guides for retailers and the foodservice industry, and representation at food-related trade shows to distribute literature and product samples. The Council's website also serves as a source of product availability and trade information, as well as pomegranate history and health benefits, recipes, crafting ideas, and answers to frequently asked questions. In addition to the website, the Council uses both domestic and overseas advertising agencies, as well as field promotion programs, to achieve its goals of international pomegranate awareness. The Council provides information and marketing materials to promote increased usage for the fresh market in the U.S. and for all export markets.

Much of the Pomegranate Council's current emphasis is focused on developing selected overseas markets with the help of the MAP program, under the auspices of the USDA Foreign Agricultural Service.
