= Pomegranate juice =

Juice obtained from the fruit of the pomegranate

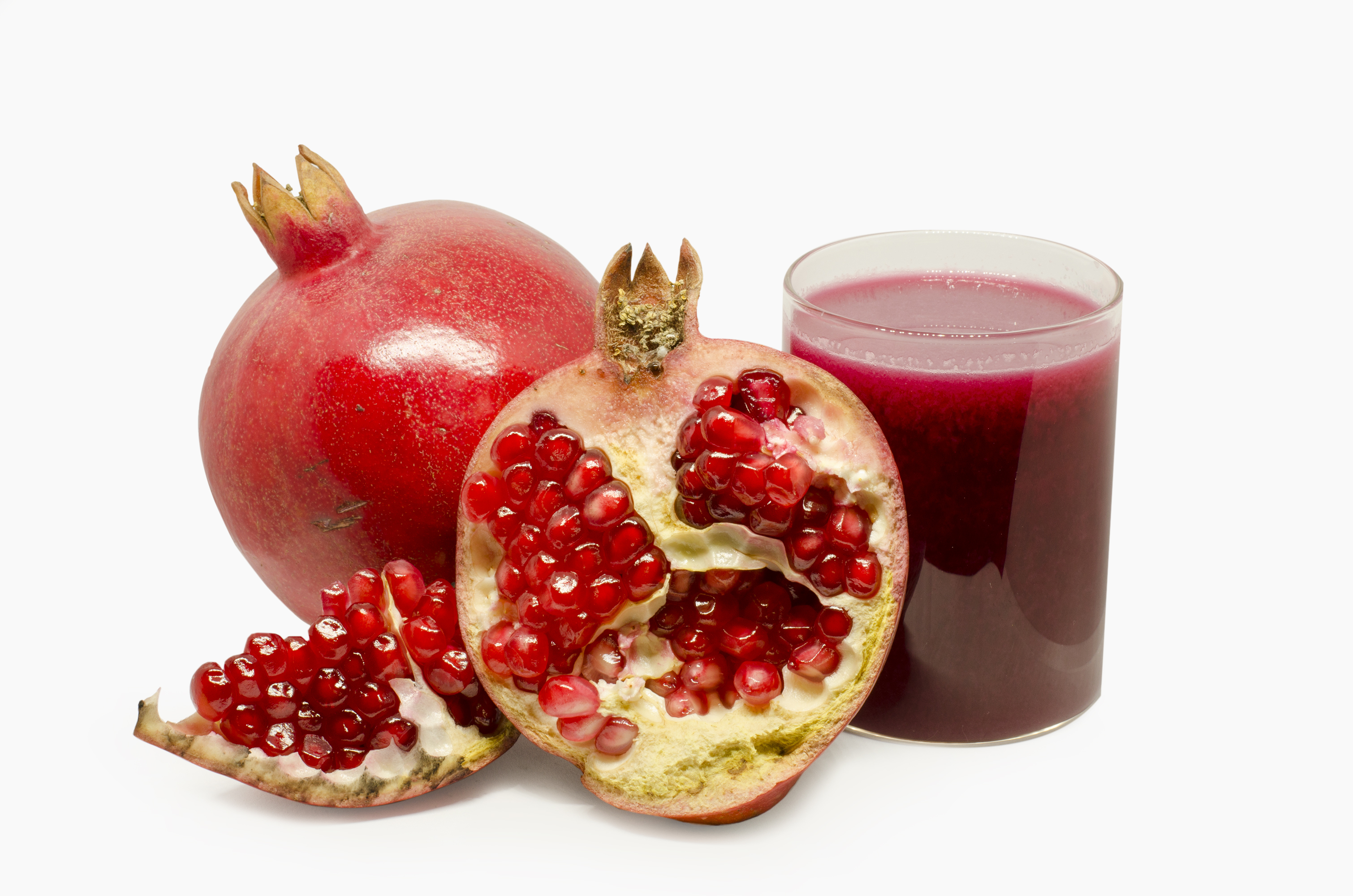
- Whole and halved pomegranates with glass of juice

Pomegranate juice is made from the fruit of the pomegranate. It is used in cooking both as a fresh juice and as a concentrated syrup.

== Research ==
Various primary studies have been conducted into possible health benefits derived from drinking pomegranate juice, but there is no good evidence to suggest any effect in blood pressure management, glucose and insulin management, or heart disease.

=== Potential risks ===
Interactions with prescription drugs are possible.

=== Marketing and false advertising ===
Pomegranate juice was marketed by POM Wonderful, a pomegranate products manufacturer. As of September 2010, the company and its principals were the subjects of a false advertising complaint by the Federal Trade Commission (FTC). In May 2012, after a hearing, the administrative law judge issued an opinion upholding certain false advertising allegations in the FTC's complaint—based on implied as opposed to express claims—and finding for POM Wonderful on other points. As of May 24, 2012, POM Wonderful's action in the U.S. District Court was pending consideration.

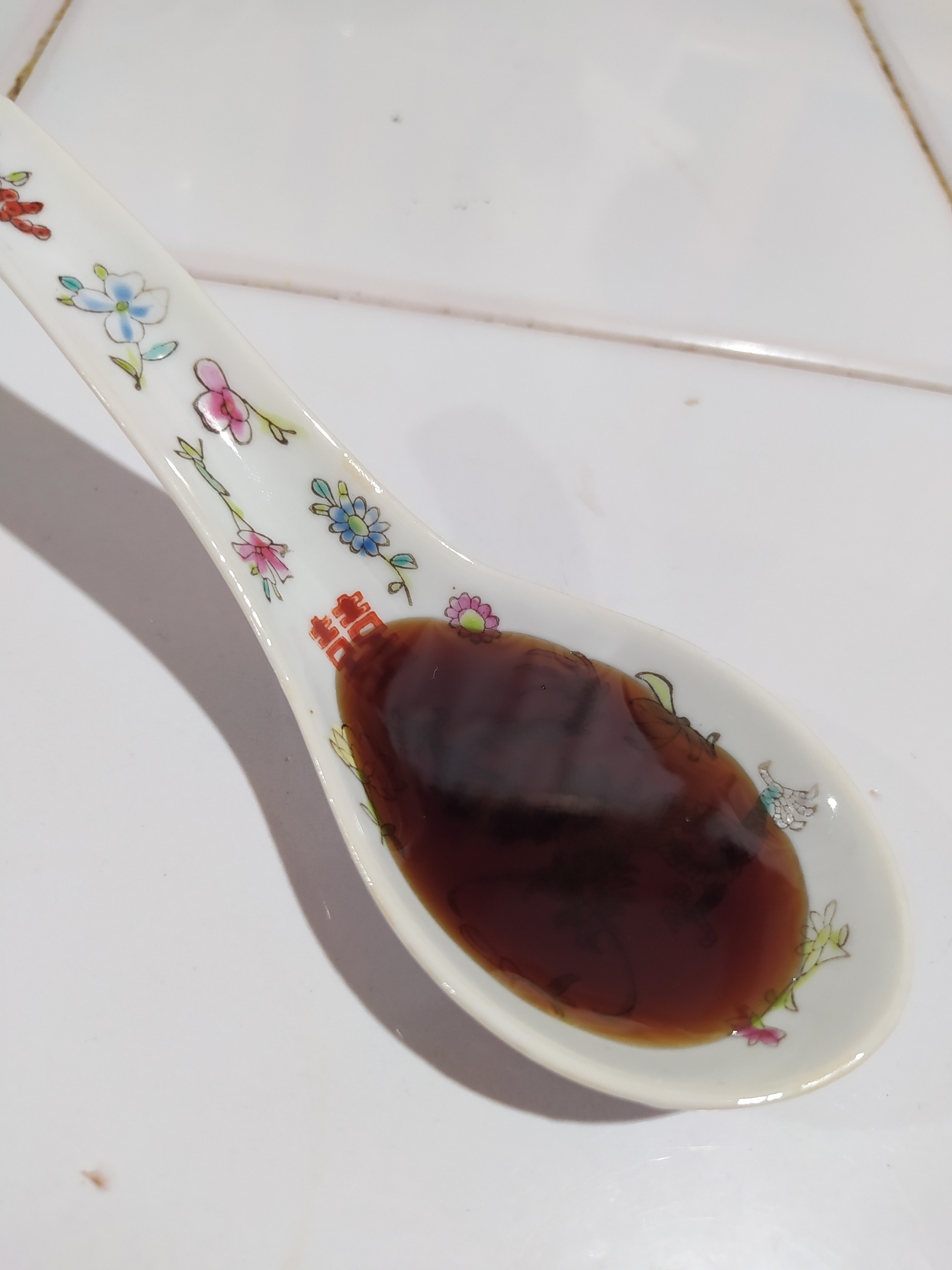
Pomegranate molasses

== Pomegranate molasses ==
Pomegranate molasses is a fruit syrup made from pomegranate juice, not sugarcane-derived molasses. It is a reduction from the juice of a tart variety of pomegranate, evaporated to form a thick, dark red liquid. It is used in multiple Middle Eastern cuisines.

== See also ==
- Juicing
- List of juices
