= Joe Moravsky =

American athlete and meteorologist

- Moravsky in 2023
- Born: March 23, 1989 (age 37); Sherman, Connecticut
- Education: Western Connecticut State University (BS)
- Occupations: Athlete; meteorologist; television host
- Years active: 2013–present
- Television: American Ninja Warrior
- Height: 5 ft 10 in (178 cm)
- Spouse: Stephanie Moravsky (m. 2014)
- Children: 3
- Parents: Joseph Moravsky (father); Robin Moravsky (mother)
- Awards: American Ninja Warrior: USA vs. The World (2016); American Ninja Warrior: Ninja vs. Ninja (2017); National Ninja League (2020)
- Website: joemoravsky.com

Joe Moravsky (born March 23, 1989) is an American athlete, meteorologist, and Owner at Monroe Ninja Academy. He has competed on American Ninja Warrior in seasons five through seventeen. He has twice been the Last Ninja Standing on American Ninja Warrior, and has competed on USA Network's Team Ninja Warrior seasons one and two, winning the latter.

== Early life and education ==
Moravsky was born on March 23, 1989, in Sherman, Connecticut. Growing up, he was involved in many different sports, including baseball, gymnastics, soccer, and racing. He followed his other interest in college, studying meteorology at Western Connecticut State University. He worked as a weatherman before he began competing on American Ninja Warrior.

== American Ninja Warrior ==
=== Season 5 ===
In the fifth season, Moravsky's qualifier run was fast-forwarded but placed first with a time of 1:02.95 and moved on to city finals as the fastest compe in Baltimore, according to Matt Iseman. In the city finals, Moravsky placed second and completed the course with a time of 3:11.97. At the national finals, he successfully completed with 36.23 seconds left, the 4th fastest time overall. During Stage 2, Moravsky was the first finisher. When Moravsky moved on to Stage 3, he fell on the third obstacle, the Floating Boards. When he failed to make the transition to the fourth board, he placed second overall. The only person to beat him that year was Brian Arnold, who made it to the Flying Bar.

=== Season 6 ===
During St. Louis qualifiers; he finished the course with the fastest time of the night with 1:04.13 on the clock. At the city finals, despite breaking the Rumbling Dice, he once again finished with the fastest time of the night with 3:40.48. During Stage 1 of the national finals, he finished with 29.79 left on the clock, the fourth fastest time. On Stage 2, he was one of two finishers. He barely finished, however, with only over a second left on the clock when he hit the buzzer. On Stage 3, he became the third American to complete the Ultimate Cliffhanger and fell on the Hang Climb. Despite the fall, he was the Last Man Standing.

=== Season 7 ===
In the Pittsburgh qualifiers of season seven, he ended up with the second fastest time with 1:34.17, just behind Elet Hall. In the city finals, he ended up with the second fastest time again of 7:28.92, this time behind Geoff Britten. In Las Vegas during the national finals, Moravsky beat Stage 1 with 35.31 seconds left, which was the sixth fastest overall. He was the last of the 8 competitors to complete Stage 2. Moravsky completed Stage 2 with 20.41 left, the fourth fastest time. When he advanced to Stage Three, he placed fifth when he fell on the Ultimate Cliffhanger, transitioning to the final ledge. In USA vs. The World, Moravsky was once again part of Team USA, this time along with Isaac Caldiero, Kevin Bull, Geoff Britten, Drew Drechsel, and Ian Dory. He ran on Stage 2 and Stage 3.

=== Season 8 ===
Beginning season eight in Philadelphia, in the qualifiers, he put up the third fastest time behind Anthony DeFranco and Jon Alexis Jr. with a time of 2:00.29. In city finals, while no one completed the course, he placed second behind Chris Wilczewski, failing at the Invisible ladder. At the national finals, he completed Stage 1 slower than before, with only over 4 seconds left, and placed 15th out of 17 finishers. On Stage 2, he shockingly suffered his first fall, which was not on Stage 3, when he fell on the Wave Runner, ending his season early.

=== Season 9 ===
Before season nine, his uncle Rob died. This became his main motivation for the season. In an interview, he talked about the season and not having family at qualifiers and city finals. He also talked about the course and why he's confident every time he heads in. In Cleveland qualifying, he placed second, one second behind Anthony DeFranco with a time of 2:32.77. During the city finals, he became one of only two people to beat the Nail Clipper. He finished at the top of the leaderboard for the first time in a while, with a time of 7:24.10, over one minute faster than Jamie Rahn. At Stage 1 in Vegas, he beat the course with plenty of time, putting up the sixth fastest time with 42.76 seconds left on the clock by the time he finished. He became one of forty-one finishers, advancing to Stage 2 once again. On that course, he was one of three people to finish, having 25.66 seconds left. On Stage 3 for the fourth time in the regular season, he made it further than ever before, beating new and modified obstacles, but ultimately fell short when he fell on the Time Bomb. Despite that, he was the Last Man Standing for the second time.

=== Season 10 ===
Joe Moravsky was supposed to compete in Philadelphia for American Ninja Warrior season 10, but weather conditions caused him and a group of competitors to compete in Minneapolis instead. Moravsky finished 1st overall in the qualifying course, 2nd place in the city finals, and advanced to the national finals. He fell on the third obstacle of Stage One, the Double Dipper, and was visibly upset during his post-run interview. It marked the first time he ever failed on Stage One of the National Finals.

=== Season 11 ===
Joe Moravsky competed in American Ninja Warrior Season 11 in Baltimore, where he debuted in ANW 5. During qualifying, he cleared the first five obstacles but failed all three attempts at the Mega Wall due to the slippery and windy conditions. He advanced to the city finals by placing 10th overall but failed the blind catch on Angry Birds, marking his fifth failure anywhere other than Stage 3. He still qualified for the National Finals by placing 7th overall. Moravsky redeemed himself on the Double Dipper in Stage One and cleared Stage Two for the fifth time. On Stage Three, he injured his hand on the Ultimate Cliffhanger but cleared the new Pipe Dream obstacle. Moravsky failed on the final jump, slid off the rail, and said he had made a mistake in his post-run interview.

=== Season 12 ===
Moravsky returned for American Ninja Warrior's twelfth season with Will Schlageter and Jeshuah Lewis. Moravsky earned the second-fastest time during his qualifying run, earning himself a spot at the Power Tower. Moravsky beat Michael Torres and won his teammates a place in the semifinals. He earned the fastest time in the semifinal round, beating Lucas Reale by one second.

As the finals rolled in, Joe Moravsky again took the stage as the final runner. However, a slight misstep on the eighth obstacle, Slam Dunk, led to a missed transition to the second ball, causing it to slip out of the cradle. Moravsky could not secure a spot in the Power Tower playoffs, marking the first time he failed to progress to the next round via a leaderboard.

=== Season 13 ===
During the qualifying round, he completed the course and conquered the Mega Wall for the second consecutive season. This achievement earned him a $10,000 prize and secured him the title of the third fastest time of the night. Moravsky was the first competitor of the first season to conquer the Mega Wall. Moravsky maintained his strong performance in the semifinals by finishing the course with the second-fastest time. Additionally, he engaged in a competitive showdown on the Power Tower, emerging victorious against his student, Jay Lewis.

Moravsky fell into the water on the High Road in the National Finals due to food poisoning. Despite this setback, he used his safety pass and demonstrated resilience by completing Stage One with 30.24 seconds remaining. Unfortunately, his journey ended when he failed to overcome the first obstacle of Stage Two.

=== Season 14 ===
Joe was determined to win it all this year, and started out by getting the mega wall for the 3rd time in a row. In semifinals, he had a strong run, and ultimately ended up failing on Dragonback. He was supposed to run in Vegas, but his wife, Stephanie, tested positive for COVID, and Joe had to bow out.

=== American Ninja Warrior: Ninja vs. Ninja ===
==== Season 2 ====
Joe Moravsky participated in the second season of Team American Ninja Warrior, which premiered on USA Network on April 18, 2017, and concluded with the season finale on June 27, 2017. In that season, there were 28 teams, three of them captained by women. Moravsky was the captain of the Storm Team and led them to victory, making them the season's champions.

Team name	Team captain	Team member	Team member	Result	Notes	Refs
Storm Team	Joe Moravsky	Josh Levin	Allyssa Beird	(gold) Champion		
Team TNT	Travis Rosen	Brett Sims	Marybeth Wang	(silver) Runner-up	Won the Relay Showdown in Finals Episode 2 but lost to Storm Team in the Championship Relay	
Iron Grip	Daniel Gil	Nate Burkhalter/Scott Willson	Barclay Stockett	(bronze) Finalist	Eliminated during the Relay Showdown in Finals Episode 1; Nate Burkhalter injured his shoulder during the qualifying round in Finals Episode 1 and was unable to continue, and alternate Scott Willson replaced him	
Real Life Beasts	Drew Drechsel	James McGrath	Erica Cook/Sarah Schoback	(bronze) Finalist	McGrath injured his shoulder during his first run in Qualifying, but was able to continue; Erica Cook had ACL injury during the knockout round in Finals Episode 2 and was replaced in the Relay Showdown by Sarah Schoback; eliminated during Relay Showdown in Finals Episode 2	

== Personal life ==
Moravsky studied meteorology at Western Connecticut State University, and used to be seen frequently as a freelance meteorologist at News 12 Connecticut. He currently travels in partnership with Ninja Coalition doing special events. Moravsky is currently married and has three kids with his wife, Stephanie.

=== Coaching ===
Moravsky trains future Ninja Warriors, such as Jay Lewis, at the Stamford Ninja Academy in Stamford, Connecticut and has inspired people nationwide. One of those people, Noah Jones, competed against him in American Ninja Warrior.

=== Business ventures ===
In 2026, Moravsky opened Monroe Ninja Academy, an indoor ninja training facility in Monroe, Connecticut. The academy is located at 17 Enterprise Drive and offers obstacle-course training for athletes of different ages and skill levels.
