= Geoff Britten =

American athlete and cameraman

- Born: c. 1979; Olney, Maryland
- Occupations: Athlete, cameraman

Geoff Britten is an American athlete and cameraman who competed on American Ninja Warrior in seasons six through eight and season eleven. He is best known for finishing all four stages of the National Finals course in season seven, becoming, together with Isaac Caldiero, one of the first two Americans to achieve what is known as "Total Victory".

== Career ==
=== Season 6 ===
Britten first competed on American Ninja Warrior in season six, making it to the National Finals in Las Vegas. However, he failed to complete the fourth obstacle, the Jumping Spider, and was eliminated on Stage 1.

=== Season 7 ===
In season seven, Britten again advanced to the National Finals and achieved "Total Victory", completing Stage 4 and leading Ninja Warrior commentator Akbar Gbajabiamila to immediately declare "Geoff Britten is the first American Ninja Warrior." After Britten's run, Isaac Caldiero finished the course over three seconds faster, winning the show's top prize of $1,000,000. This created some controversy over who was truly the first "American Ninja Warrior." While Britten admitted that Caldiero had defeated him and deserved the victory, he still believed he deserved some credit for his accomplishments: "There's been a lot of people confused about the verbiage – 'first American Ninja Warrior' or 'first winner.' The way I feel about it is I did it first. Caldiero went out there and crushed it. I'm not trying to take anything away from him, but it does not take away from what I did. He's like the grand champion." Fellow competitor Joe Moravsky opined, "In my opinion, Geoff is technically the first American Ninja Warrior and Isaac is the second. The only difference is Isaac climbed it faster so he gets the million and won the season." Series producer Kent Weed stated in an interview with The Hollywood Reporter that while Caldiero had in fact won the season, Britten "does get the great gratification. I don't think he harbors any ill will about it....Geoff said to me, 'If I was going to be beat by someone, I'm glad it's Isaac.' And I think Isaac would have felt the same way if the roles were reversed." In an interview with Entertainment Weekly, Weed was asked if Britten got anything for coming in second: "He got to be one of the first American Ninja Warriors. According to the rules there's only one winner. We talked to NBC about it, we might make adjustments next season, but we didn't plan for a second finisher."

=== Season 8 ===
Britten returned to Ninja Warrior in season eight, again advancing to the National Finals. Within a matter of seconds, Britten slipped and fell on the first obstacle of Stage 1, Snake Run, ending his season. After the episode aired, Britten announced on his social media accounts that he would not return to Ninja Warrior for season nine in order to spend more time with his family, stating, "I think it's interesting that Isaac, after last year, beat it all, [and] didn't come back. He's another climber. I'm a climber and I kind of felt the same way. Like 'Eh, it's kind of weird to be back to this. I already did it.' You know?" He did, however, leave the door open for a future return: "I'm hoping I can come back when I'm 40. I set a goal for myself. Go away for a while and come back, and hopefully have that fire again. Have a new challenge."

=== Season 11 ===
On May 2, 2018, Britten announced plans to return to Ninja Warrior competition in 2019 for season eleven. He competed in the Seattle/Tacoma City Qualifiers but failed on the Broken Bridge obstacle and was ultimately unable to advance to the City Finals.

== Personal life ==
Britten works as a cameraman for sports teams in the Baltimore, Maryland, and Washington, D.C. areas, such as the Baltimore Orioles, Washington Capitals, and Washington Wizards.
