= American Ninja Warrior season 8 =

Season of American reality/sport competition television series American Ninja Warrior

American Ninja Warrior
- Season 8
- Hosted by: Matt Iseman; Akbar Gbaja-Biamila; Kristine Leahy
- No. of contestants: 500
- Finals venue: Las Vegas, NV
- No. of episodes: 13

Release
- Original network: NBC; Esquire Network
- Original release: June 1 – September 12, 2016

Season chronology
- ← Previous; Season 7 Next → Season 9

The eighth season of American Ninja Warrior premiered on June 1, 2016, on NBC. Hosts Matt Iseman and Akbar Gbaja-Biamila returned for their respective seventh and fourth seasons, alongside sideline reporter Kristine Leahy who returned for her second season. The grand prize stayed even with season 7, at $1,000,000. In addition, 28 new obstacles were created for this season, and there were 40% more female applicants over last season.

== Competition schedule ==
| Qualifying airing | Finals airing | City | Qualifying date | Finals date | Venue |
|---|---|---|---|---|---|
| June 1, 2016 | July 11, 2016 | Los Angeles, California | April 5, 2016 | April 6, 2016 | Universal Studios Hollywood |
| June 8, 2016 | July 18, 2016 | Atlanta, Georgia | March 18, 2016 | March 19, 2016 | Turner Field |
| June 13, 2016 | July 25, 2016 | Indianapolis, Indiana | April 27, 2016 | April 28, 2016 | Monument Circle |
| June 20, 2016 | August 1, 2016 | Oklahoma City, Oklahoma | May 13, 2016 | May 14, 2016 | Oklahoma State Capitol |
| June 27, 2016 | August 22, 2016 | Philadelphia, Pennsylvania | May 26, 2016 | May 27, 2016 | Richmond Power Plant |

== Obstacles ==
=== City Qualifying & Finals ===
| Event | | Obstacles | | | | | | | | | | Finishers |
|---|---|---|---|---|---|---|---|---|---|---|---|---|
| Los Angeles | Qualifying | Floating Steps | Tick Tock | Escalator | Ring Jump | I-Beam Cross | Warped Wall | | | | | 17 |
| Los Angeles | Finals | Floating Steps | Tick Tock | Escalator | Ring Jump | I-Beam Cross | Warped Wall | Salmon Ladder | The Wedge | Helix Hang | Invisible Ladder | 1 |
| Atlanta | Qualifying | Floating Steps | Big Dipper | Block Run | Spin Cycle | Pipe Fitter | Warped Wall | | | | | 27 |
| Atlanta | Finals | Floating Steps | Big Dipper | Block Run | Spin Cycle | Pipe Fitter | Warped Wall | Salmon Ladder | Floating Monkey Bars | The Clacker | Invisible Ladder | 4 |
| Indianapolis | Qualifying | Floating Steps | Rolling Log | Fly Wheels | Disc Runner | Swinging Spikes | Warped Wall | | | | | 25 |
| Indianapolis | Finals | Floating Steps | Rolling Log | Fly Wheels | Disc Runner | Swinging Spikes | Warped Wall | Salmon Ladder | Hourglass Drop | Circuit Board | Invisible Ladder | 4 |
| Oklahoma City | Qualifying | Floating Steps | Ring Swing | Log Runner | Tire Swing | Bar Hop | Warped Wall | | | | | 15 |
| Oklahoma City | Finals | Floating Steps | Ring Swing | Log Runner | Tire Swing | Bar Hop | Warped Wall | Salmon Ladder | Bungee Road | Window Hang | Invisible Ladder | 2 |
| Philadelphia | Qualifying | Floating Steps | Log Grip | Paddle Boards | Wall Drop | Rolling Thunder | Warped Wall | | | | | 9 |
| Philadelphia | Finals | Floating Steps | Log Grip | Paddle Boards | Wall Drop | Rolling Thunder | Warped Wall | Salmon Ladder | Flying Shelf Grab | Stair Hopper | Invisible Ladder | 0 |

=== National Finals ===
| Event | Obstacle(s) | | | | | | | | Finishers |
|---|---|---|---|---|---|---|---|---|---|
| Stage 1 | Snake Run | Propeller Bar | Giant Log Grip | Jumping Spider | Sonic Curve | Warped Wall | Broken Bridge | Flying Squirrel | 17 |
| Stage 2 | Giant Ring Swing | Down Up Salmon Ladder | Wave Runner | Butterfly Wall | Double Wedge | Wall Flip | | | 2 |
| Stage 3 | Keylock Hang | Floating Boards | Ultimate Cliffhanger | Curved Body Prop | Hang Climb | Walking Bar | Flying Bar | | 0 |
| Stage 4 | Rope Climb | | | | | | | | N/A |

== City courses ==
=== Los Angeles ===
==== Qualifying ====
The Los Angeles Qualifying round featured four new or modified obstacles and concluded with 17 finishers. Both Jessie Graff and Natalie Duran made it to the Warped Wall, and Jessie got a buzzer while Natalie failed in the qualifying round. In addition, the Facebook video showcasing Graff's qualifying run was viewed more than 50 million times leading up to the Finals round. Kevin Bull earned the "POM Wonderful Run of the Night" with the fastest time (2:02.81). Additionally, actor Brennan Mejia, the Red Power Ranger from Power Rangers Dino Super Charge, failed on the second obstacle again.

Obstacles used during Los Angeles Qualifying are listed below.

Competitors who advanced to the City Finals are listed below.

| Rank | Finalist | Outcome | Obstacle/Time |
|---|---|---|---|
| 1 | Kevin Bull | Completed | 2:02.81 (POM Wonderful Run of the Night) |
| 2 | Flip Rodriguez | Completed | 2:23.12 |
| 3 | Chris Workman | Completed | 2:24.45 |
| 4 | Sean Bryan | Completed | 2:30.11 |
| 5 | Nicholas Coolridge | Completed | 2:33.37 |
| 6 | Gabe Hurtado | Completed | 3:08.70 |
| 7 | Justin Hillsten | Completed | 3:28.90 |
| 8 | Ryan Robinson | Completed | 3:30.95 |
| 9 | Liam Buell | Completed | 3:34.24 |
| 10 | Grant McCartney | Completed | 4:23.47 |
| 11 | Jessie Graff | Completed | 4:27.84 |
| 12 | Josh Levin | Completed | 4:35.21 |
| 13 | Nick Hanson | Completed | 4:43.68 |
| 14 | Brian Kretsch | Completed | 4:45.30 |
| 15 | Ben Melick | Completed | 2:50.16 |
| 16 | Ted Jung | Completed | 5:19.83 |
| 17 | Jerod Warf | Completed | 7:02.60 |
| 18 | Steve Seiver | Failed | Warped Wall (3:22.84) |
| 19 | Natalie Duran | Failed | Warped Wall (4:03.58) |
| 20 | Adam Rayl | Failed | I-Beam Cross (0:58.91) |
| 21 | Alan Connealy | Failed | I-Beam Cross (1:04.24) |
| 22 | Jackson Meyer | Failed | I-Beam Cross (1:07.76) |
| 23 | Jesse La Flair | Failed | I-Beam Cross (1:17.12) |
| 24 | Jesse Cargill | Failed | I-Beam Cross (1:18.64) |
| 25 | Jonathan Cunanan | Failed | I-Beam Cross (1:23.88) |
| 26 | Grey Kantor | Failed | I-Beam Cross (1:26.46) |
| 27 | Alex Smith | Failed | I-Beam Cross (1:29.64) |
| 28 | Ben Antoine | Failed | I-Beam Cross (1:37.46) |
| 29 | K.C. Halik | Failed | I-Beam Cross (1:42.23) |
| 30 | Scott Willson | Failed | I-Beam Cross (1:42.71) |

==== Finals ====
The Los Angeles Finals round featured one new obstacle, The Wedge, as well as three modified obstacles from city qualifying. The round concluded with one finisher, the lowest number of any final to date unless the chance of a non-completed course. Rock climber and engineering student Josh Levin, who was a rookie, earned the "POM Wonderful Run of the Night" and the only finish, with a time of 8:21.30. Jessie Graff came in second place, breaking her own record for the highest finish by a woman in a city competition.

Obstacles used during the Los Angeles Finals are listed below.

Competitors who advanced to the Vegas Finals are listed below.

| Rank | Finalist | Outcome | Obstacle/Time |
|---|---|---|---|
| 1 | Josh Levin | Completed | 8:21.30 (POM Wonderful Run of the Night) |
| 2 | Jessie Graff | Failed | Helix Hang (6:07.36) |
| 3 | Kevin Bull | Failed | The Wedge (2:34.03) |
| 4 | Chris Workman | Failed | The Wedge (3:25.97) |
| 5 | Nicholas Coolridge | Failed | The Wedge (3:28.89) |
| 6 | Adam Rayl | Failed | The Wedge (3:34.93) |
| 7 | Flip Rodriguez | Failed | The Wedge (3:39.43) |
| 8 | Gabe Hurtado | Failed | The Wedge (3:46.56) |
| 9 | Liam Buell | Failed | The Wedge (4:04.51) |
| 10 | Grant McCartney | Failed | The Wedge (4:09.06) |
| 11 | Ryan Robinson | Failed | The Wedge (4:18.86) |
| 12 | Justin Hillsten | Failed | The Wedge (4:19.73) |
| 13 | Jackson Meyer | Failed | The Wedge (4:20.93) |
| 14 | Nick Hanson | Failed | The Wedge (4:44.10) |
| 15 | Ben Melick | Failed | The Wedge (4:44.16) |

=== Atlanta ===
==== Qualifying ====
The Atlanta Qualifying round featured three new or modified obstacles and concluded with 27 finishers. Gym owner Drew Drechsel earned the "POM Wonderful Run of the Night" with the fastest time (1:19.44).

Obstacles used during Atlanta Qualifying are listed below.

Competitors who advanced to the City Finals are listed below.

| Rank | Finalist | Outcome | Obstacle/Time |
|---|---|---|---|
| 1 | Drew Drechsel | Completed | 1:19.44 (POM Wonderful Run of the Night) |
| 2 | Caleb Watson | Completed | 1:29.98 |
| 3 | Neil Craver | Completed | 1:30.40 |
| 4 | James McGrath | Completed | 1:45.96 |
| 5 | Tyler Martin | Completed | 2:08.15 |
| 6 | Chris Boehm | Completed | 2:12.01 |
| 7 | Brett Sims | Completed | 2:22.21 |
| 8 | Justin Maina | Completed | 2:26.12 |
| 9 | Mack Roesch | Completed | 2:29.93 |
| 10 | Kenneth Niemitalo | Completed | 2:30.84 |
| 11 | Travis Rosen | Completed | 2:34.03 |
| 12 | Casey Suchocki | Completed | 2:37.15 |
| 13 | Todd Bourgeois | Completed | 2:50.25 |
| 14 | Reko Rivera | Completed | 2:57.81 |
| 15 | Danny Adair | Completed | 2:58.87 |
| 16 | Jonathan Ruiz | Completed | 3:04.08 |
| 17 | Yuri Force | Completed | 3:09.89 |
| 18 | Jo Jo Bynum | Completed | 3:14.81 |
| 19 | Shawn Richardson | Completed | 3:22.56 |
| 20 | Chad Hohn | Completed | 3:32.37 |
| 21 | Eddy Stewart | Completed | 3:34.37 |
| 22 | Jeff Harvey | Completed | 3:43.78 |
| 23 | Mike Chick | Completed | 3:55.55 |
| 24 | Alexio Gomes | Completed | 4:04.91 |
| 25 | Brent Ruffin | Completed | 4:16.60 |
| 26 | Lucas Gomes | Completed | 4:25.41 |
| 27 | Joseph Greene II | Completed | 5:02.39 |
| 28 | Rodolfo Burgos | Failed | Warped Wall (2:09.51) |
| 29 | Bobby Bohannon | Failed | Pipefitter (0:58.68) |
| 30 | Chris Moore | Failed | Pipefitter (1:08.10) |

==== Finals ====
The Atlanta Finals round featured one new obstacle, The Clacker, as well as two modified obstacles from city qualifying. The round concluded with four finishers. Stock trader and ANW veteran Travis Rosen, earned the "POM Wonderful Run of the Night" with a time of 6:52.17, coming in third place. Roommates James McGrath and Drew Drechsel competed for the fastest time of the night when they came in first and second place, with times of 5:01.62 (McGrath) and 5:05.26 (Drechsel). After competing since the premiere season in 2009, parkour trainer and original ANW veteran Brett Sims made it to his first Vegas final with a time of 7:36.45, ending up in 4th place. During Drew Drechsel's run, Lucas Gomes was "on the bubble" in 15th Place, meaning if Drew got past the 8th obstacle, he would be eliminated in 16th place. He ended up in 16th, behind Todd Bourgeois. Someone got injured before Las Vegas so he did get in the top 15.

Obstacles used during the Atlanta Finals are listed below.

Competitors who advanced to the Vegas Finals are listed below.

| Rank | Finalist | Outcome | Obstacle/Time |
|---|---|---|---|
| 1 | James McGrath | Completed | 5:01.62 |
| 2 | Drew Dreschel | Completed | 5:05.26 |
| 3 | Travis Rosen | Completed | 6:52.17 (POM Wonderful Run of the Night) |
| 4 | Brett Sims | Completed | 7:36.45 |
| 5 | Casey Suchocki | Failed | The Clacker (3:24.45) |
| 6 | Shawn Richardson | Failed | The Clacker (4:37.34) |
| 7 | Jo Jo Bynum | Failed | The Clacker (6:07.44) |
| 8 | Neil Craver | Failed | Floating Monkey Bars (2:47.10) |
| 9 | Tyler Martin | Failed | Floating Monkey Bars (3:44.46) |
| 10 | Chris Boehm | Failed | Floating Monkey Bars (3:51.21) |
| 11 | Yuri Force | Failed | Floating Monkey Bars (3:54.59) |
| 12 | Mike Chick | Failed | Floating Monkey Bars (4:09.59) |
| 13 | Alexio Gomes | Failed | Floating Monkey Bars (4:11.25) |
| 14 | Mack Roesch | Failed | Floating Monkey Bars (4:16.77) |
| 15 | Todd Bourgeois | Failed | Floating Monkey Bars (4:33.40) |

- Lucas Gomes was brought back as a wildcard and an injury replacement for Tyler Martin.

=== Indianapolis ===
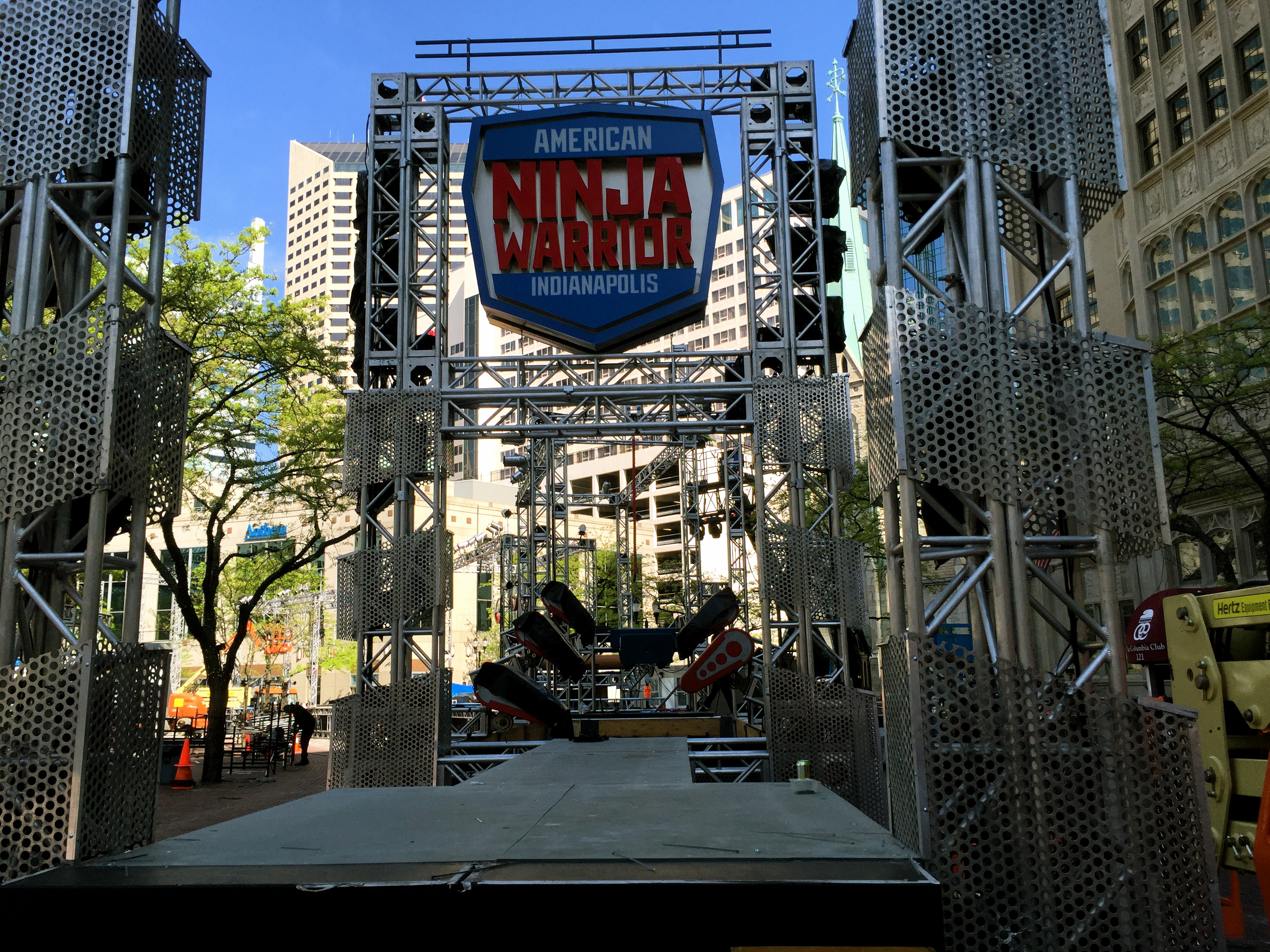
The Indianapolis city course, still under construction a couple of days before the competitions

==== Qualifying ====
The Indianapolis Qualifying round featured four new or modified obstacles and concluded with 25 finishers. Rock Climbing coach Meagan Martin was the only woman to advance to the city finals, earned the "POM Wonderful Run of the Night" with a time of 6:30.08. She became the first woman to scale the warped wall three years in a row. The Indianapolis round also featured IndyCar drivers Hélio Castroneves, Tony Kanaan, and Josef Newgarden as well as NASCAR driver and 2-time Xfinity Series champ Ricky Stenhouse Jr. and one-legged wrestler Zach Gowen. However, none ended up moving on to the Indianapolis city finals. This was the first time ever that the course was built in a curve.

Obstacles used during Indianapolis Qualifying are listed below.

Competitors who advanced to the City Finals are listed below.

| Rank | Finalist | Outcome | Obstacle/Time |
|---|---|---|---|
| 1 | Lorin Ball | Completed | 1:36.44 |
| 2 | Jake Murray | Completed | 2:00.13 |
| 3 | Adam Arnold | Completed | 2:00.36 |
| 4 | Dan Yager | Completed | 2:11.90 |
| 5 | Brian Arnold | Completed | 2:18.15 |
| 6 | Ian Dory | Completed | 2:46.55 |
| 7 | Brandon Mears | Completed | 2:55.01 |
| 8 | Dan Polizzi | Completed | 3:00.78 |
| 9 | Eric Middleton | Completed | 3:01.80 |
| 10 | Theodore "TC" Tronquet | Completed | 3:12.47 |
| 11 | Ethan Swanson | Completed | 3:13.58 |
| 12 | Dan Banura | Completed | 3:20.56 |
| 13 | Tyler Yamauchi | Completed | 3:21.70 |
| 14 | Drew Knapp | Completed | 3:25.81 |
| 15 | Zack Kemmerer | Completed | 3:30.77 |
| 16 | Matt Wilder | Completed | 3:32.57 |
| 17 | Tyler Smith | Completed | 3:36.27 |
| 18 | PJ Granger | Completed | 4:06.74 |
| 19 | Andrew "Roo" Yori | Completed | 4:10.22 |
| 20 | Kevin Hogan | Completed | 4:28.13 |
| 21 | Ryan Elliot | Completed | 4:58.25 |
| 22 | Jonathan Cooley | Completed | 5:00.43 |
| 23 | Andrew Rowland | Completed | 5:17.80 |
| 24 | Fred Thorne | Completed | 5:36.84 |
| 25 | Meagan Martin | Completed | 6:30.08 (POM Wonderful Run of the Night) |
| 26 | Adam Stroup | Failed | Warped Wall (2:51.01) |
| 27 | Alex Bienz | Failed | Warped Wall (6:31.19) |
| 28 | Bryce Foley | Failed | Swinging Spikes (2:07.82) |
| 29 | Ben Jackson | Failed | Swinging Spikes (2:21.37) |
| 30 | Dr. John Murray Adams | Failed | Swinging Spikes (2:32.99) |

==== Finals ====
The Indianapolis Finals round featured one new obstacle, Circuit Board, and three modified obstacles from the qualifying round. The round concluded with four finishers. Wedding photographer Jake Murray earned the "POM Wonderful Run of the Night" with a time of 6:34.68, coming in second place. The fastest time of the night went to maintenance technician Adam Arnold, with a first place time of 5:40.42. Even though she failed on the Circuit Board obstacle, rock climbing coach Meagan Martin became the second woman to make it to the Las Vegas finals with a time of 7:31.83, finishing in 8th place. This was Meagan's first time on a back half of a Finals course and first time qualifying for the National Finals in Las Vegas.

Obstacles used during the Indianapolis Finals are listed below.

Competitors who advanced to the Vegas Finals are listed below.

| Rank | Finalist | Outcome | Obstacle/Time |
|---|---|---|---|
| 1 | Adam Arnold | Completed | 5:40.42 |
| 2 | Jake Murray | Completed | 6:34.68 (POM Wonderful Run of the Night) |
| 3 | Brian Arnold | Completed | 6:37.87 |
| 4 | Ian Dory | Completed | 7:53.91 |
| 5 | Ethan Swanson | Failed | Invisible Ladder (6:41.12) |
| 6 | Dan Polizzi | Failed | Circuit Board (4:24.68) |
| 7 | Ryan Elliott | Failed | Circuit Board (5:24.47) |
| 8 | Meagan Martin | Failed | Circuit Board (7:31.83) |
| 9 | Eric Middleton | Failed | Hourglass Drop (3:06.78) |
| 10 | Dan Banura | Failed | Hourglass Drop (3:17.81) |
| 11 | Tyler Smith | Failed | Hourglass Drop (3:55.69) |
| 12 | Tyler Yamauchi | Failed | Hourglass Drop (4:14.08) |
| 13 | Ben Jackson | Failed | Hourglass Drop (4:30.69) |
| 14 | Matt Wilder | Failed | Hourglass Drop (4:35.22) |
| 15 | Andrew “Roo” Yori | Failed | Hourglass Drop (5:12.32) |

=== Oklahoma City ===
==== Qualifying ====
The Oklahoma City Qualifying round featured three new or modified obstacles and concluded with 15 finishers. Even though personal trainer Artis Thompson III didn't advance to the city finals, he earned the "POM Wonderful Run of the Night" for making it to the end of the fourth obstacle, the Tire Swing with a prosthetic leg. The Oklahoma City qualifying round also featured Kacy Catanzaro, Brent Steffensen, Sam Sann, Daniel Gil and Lance Pekus. Two of them ended up moving on to the Oklahoma City finals. However, Kacy Catanzaro failed on only the third obstacle, the Log Runner. Despite this, she was once again wild-carded to the Las Vegas finals. Pekus and Sann failed on the Log Runner and the Tire Swing, respectively. Additionally, basketball player, Flip White Jr. from the Harlem Globetrotters, made an appearance.

Obstacles used during Oklahoma City Qualifying are listed below.

Competitors who advanced to the City Finals are listed below.

| Rank | Finalist | Outcome | Obstacle/Time |
|---|---|---|---|
| 1 | Thomas Stillings | Completed | 1:43.51 |
| 2 | Daniel Gil | Completed | 1:44.17 |
| 3 | David Campbell | Completed | 1:47.20 |
| 4 | Kyle Mendoza | Completed | 2:23.82 |
| 5 | Cass Clawson | Completed | 2:31.40 |
| 6 | Brian Beckstrand | Completed | 2:35.96 |
| 7 | Geoff Lancaster | Completed | 2:39.58 |
| 8 | Thomas Doweidt | Completed | 2:43.76 |
| 9 | Nate Burkhalter | Completed | 2:48.61 |
| 10 | James Wyatt | Completed | 2:54.15 |
| 11 | An Ly | Completed | 2:58.10 |
| 12 | Karsten Williams | Completed | 3:08.18 |
| 13 | Jon Stewart | Completed | 3:18.67 |
| 14 | Tremayne Dortch | Completed | 3:27.71 |
| 15 | Andrew Lowes | Completed | 3:47.09 |
| 16 | Hamidulah Khazi | Failed | Warped Wall (3:11.05) |
| 17 | Jessell Boseman | Failed | Bar Hop (1:09.17) |
| 18 | Diron Jones | Failed | Bar Hop (1:12.50) |
| 19 | Andrew Potter | Failed | Bar Hop (1:33.15) |
| 20 | Jared Brady | Failed | Bar Hop (1:43.84) |
| 21 | Mitch VeDepo | Failed | Bar Hop (1:51.64) |
| 22 | Brent Steffensen | Failed | Bar Hop (1:59.49) |
| 23 | Reid Pletcher | Failed | Bar Hop (2:18.85) |
| 24 | Chris Moore | Failed | Bar Hop (2:22.10) |
| 25 | Brian Doom | Failed | Bar Hop (2:48.83) |
| 26 | Brian Burkhardt | Failed | Tire Swing (0:34.34) |
| 27 | Clayton Wolf | Failed | Tire Swing (0:35.31) |
| 28 | Sudul Diahkah | Failed | Tire Swing (0:50.70) |
| 29 | Grant Clinton | Failed | Tire Swing (0:51.53) |
| 30 | Alexander Moran | Failed | Tire Swing (0:53.01) |

==== Finals ====
The Oklahoma City Finals round featured one new obstacle, Window Hang, and two modified obstacles from the qualifying round. The round concluded with two finishers. Bank manager Grant Clinton who suffered a stroke just 6 months ago earned the "POM Wonderful Run of the Night" with a time of 5:57.43, coming in second place. The fastest time of the night went to ninja trainer Daniel Gil, with a first place time of 5:14.27. Also, 54-year-old construction manager Jon Stewart edged out veteran "The Godfather" David Campbell, who had advanced to Mount Midoryama in all seven previous seasons. Even though Stewart failed on the Window Hang, he earned a spot in the Las Vegas finals with a time of 3:41.71, ending up in 5th place.

Obstacles used during the Oklahoma City Finals are listed below.

Competitors who advanced to the Vegas Finals are listed below.

| Rank | Finalist | Outcome | Obstacle/Time |
|---|---|---|---|
| 1 | Daniel Gil | Completed | 5:14.27 |
| 2 | Grant Clinton | Completed | 5:57.43 (POM Wonderful Run of the Night) |
| 3 | Thomas Stillings | Failed | Invisible Ladder (3:52.91) |
| 4 | Mitch VeDepo | Failed | Window Hang (3:39.32) |
| 5 | Jon Stewart | Failed | Window Hang (3:41.71) |
| 6 | An Ly | Failed | Window Hang (3:45.99) |
| 7 | Thomas Doweidt | Failed | Window Hang (3:46.73) |
| 8 | Karsten Williams | Failed | Window Hang (4:27.40) |
| 9 | Andrew Lowes | Failed | Bungee Road (3:16.31) |
| 10 | Brent Steffensen | Failed | Bungee Road (4:00.61) |
| 11 | James Wyatt | Failed | Bungee Road (4:54.59) |
| 12 | Reid Pletcher | Failed | Bungee Road (5:21.97) |
| 13 | Jessell Boseman | Failed | Salmon Ladder (2:01.91) |
| 14 | Clayton Wolf | Failed | Salmon Ladder (2:05.33) |
| 15 | Nate Burkhalter | Failed | Salmon Ladder (2:30.43) |

=== Philadelphia ===
==== Qualifying ====
The Philadelphia Qualifying round featured two new or modified obstacles and concluded with 9 finishers. High school track coach and ANW rookie Anthony DeFranco earned the "POM Wonderful Run of the Night" with the fastest time (1:44.37). Michelle Warnky, Jesse Labreck, Rachael Goldstein and Allyssa Beird, who finished 17th, 28th, 29th and 30th respectively, all moved on to the city finals - the first time four women made it into the a city qualifier Top 30 in ANW history. Other competitors also included Geoff Britten, who continued his streak of hitting every course buzzer, as well as veterans Joe Moravsky, Ryan Stratis, and Jamie Rahn, who all moved on to the city finals.

Obstacles used during Philadelphia Qualifying are listed below.

Competitors who advanced to the City Finals are listed below.

| Rank | Finalist | Outcome | Obstacle/Time |
|---|---|---|---|
| 1 | Anthony DeFranco | Completed | 1:44.37 (POM Wonderful Run of the Night) |
| 2 | Jon Alexis Jr. | Completed | 1:51.08 |
| 3 | Joe Moravsky | Completed | 2:00.29 |
| 4 | Michael Torres | Completed | 2:27.96 |
| 5 | Najee Richardson | Completed | 2:54.53 |
| 6 | Jamie Rahn | Completed | 2:57.66 |
| 7 | Geoff Britten | Completed | 3:33.97 |
| 8 | Tyler Cravens | Completed | 3:35.69 |
| 9 | Ryan Stratis | Completed | 4:29.12 |
| 10 | Mike Bernardo | Failed | Rolling Thunder (0:51.58) |
| 11 | Chris DiGangi | Failed | Rolling Thunder (1:00.34) |
| 12 | Mike Soria | Failed | Rolling Thunder (1:03.14) |
| 13 | Chris Wilczewski | Failed | Rolling Thunder (1:03.78) |
| 14 | John Gowder Jr. | Failed | Rolling Thunder (1:09.16) |
| 15 | Lori Adams | Failed | Rolling Thunder (1:13.02) |
| 16 | Brandon Pannell | Failed | Rolling Thunder (1:20.97) |
| 17 | Michelle Warnky | Failed | Rolling Thunder (1:21.08) |
| 18 | Eric Torres | Failed | Rolling Thunder (1:21.97) |
| 19 | Yancey Quezada | Failed | Rolling Thunder (1:23.15) |
| 20 | Tim Bream | Failed | Rolling Thunder (1:25.75) |
| 21 | Richard Shoemaker | Failed | Rolling Thunder (1:30.84) |
| 22 | Nick Kostreski | Failed | Rolling Thunder (1:40.16) |
| 23 | Alex Dell'Aquila | Failed | Rolling Thunder (1:40.28) |
| 24 | Greg Fleming | Failed | Rolling Thunder (1:40.68) |
| 25 | Fabio Figueiredo | Failed | Rolling Thunder (1:43.49) |
| 26 | Miles Avery | Failed | Rolling Thunder (1:46.64) |
| 27 | Carl Fantauzzo | Failed | Rolling Thunder (1:54.33) |
| 28 | Jesse Labreck | Failed | Rolling Thunder (1:58.05) |
| 29 | Rachael Goldstein | Failed | Rolling Thunder (2:01.00) |
| 30 | Allyssa Beird | Failed | Rolling Thunder (2:04.46) |

==== Finals ====
The Philadelphia Finals featured one new obstacle, the Stair Hopper and one modified obstacle from the qualifying round. Weatherman Joe Moravsky and gym owner Chris Wilczewski made it the farthest by nearly completing the Invisible Ladder; for the first time in ANW history, the city finals had no finishers, making it the hardest course in the series’ history. Caregiver Jesse "Flex" Labreck earned the POM Wonderful Run of the Night, becoming only the 3rd woman in Season 8 to advance to the Las Vegas finals and the 5th woman ever to scale the Warped Wall in ANW regular competition.

Obstacles used during the Philadelphia Finals are listed below.

Competitors who advanced to the Vegas Finals are listed below.

| Rank | Finalist | Outcome | Obstacle/Time |
|---|---|---|---|
| 1 | Chris Wilczewski | Failed | Invisible Ladder (3:33.53) |
| 2 | Joe Moravsky | Failed | Invisible Ladder (4:02.73) |
| 3 | Jon Alexis Jr. | Failed | Stair Hopper (2:56.69) |
| 4 | Jamie Rahn | Failed | Stair Hopper (3:40.06) |
| 5 | Mike Bernardo | Failed | Stair Hopper (3:41.50) |
| 6 | Najee Richardson | Failed | Stair Hopper (3:54.70) |
| 7 | Michael Torres | Failed | Stair Hopper (3:56.24) |
| 8 | Geoff Britten | Failed | Stair Hopper (4:29.69) |
| 9 | Ryan Stratis | Failed | Stair Hopper (5:07.01) |
| 10 | Jesse Labreck | Failed | Stair Hopper (6:48.87) (POM Wonderful Run of the Night) |
| 11 | Anthony DeFranco | Failed | Flying Shelf Grab (3:28.31) |
| 12 | Nick Kostreski | Failed | Flying Shelf Grab (4:11.65) |
| 13 | Brandon Pannell | Failed | Flying Shelf Grab (4:31.09) |
| 14 | Richard Shoemaker | Failed | Flying Shelf Grab (4:47.21) |
| 15 | Carl Fantauzzo | Failed | Flying Shelf Grab (5:33.27) |

== City Qualifying Leaderboard ==
| Order # | Competitor | Outcome | Obstacle/Result |
|---|---|---|---|
| 1 | Drew Drechsel | Completed | 1:19.54 |
| 2 | Caleb Watson | Completed | 1:29.98 |
| 3 | Neil Craver | Completed | 1:30.40 |
| 4 | Lorin Ball | Completed | 1:36.44 |
| 5 | Thomas Stillings | Completed | 1:43.51 |
| 6 | Daniel Gil | Completed | 1:44.17 |
| 7 | Anthony DeFranco | Completed | 1:44.37 |
| 8 | James McGrath | Completed | 1:45.96 |
| 9 | David Campbell | Completed | 1:47.20 |
| 10 | Jon Alexis Jr. | Completed | 1:51.08 |
| 11 | Jake Murray | Completed | 2:00.13 |
| 12 | Joe Moravsky | Completed | 2:00.29 |
| 13 | Adam Arnold | Completed | 2:00.36 |
| 14 | Kevin Bull | Completed | 2:02.81 |
| 15 | Tyler Martin | Completed | 2:08.15 |
| 16 | Dan Yager | Completed | 2:11.90 |
| 17 | Chris Boehm | Completed | 2:12.01 |
| 18 | Brian Arnold | Completed | 2:18.15 |
| 19 | Brett Sims | Completed | 2:22.21 |
| 20 | Flip Rodriguez | Completed | 2:23.12 |
| 21 | Kyle Mendoza | Completed | 2:23.82 |
| 22 | Chris Workman | Completed | 2:24.45 |
| 23 | Justin Maina | Completed | 2:26.12 |
| 24 | Michael Torres | Completed | 2:27.96 |
| 25 | Mack Roesch | Completed | 2:29.93 |
| 26 | Sean Bryan | Completed | 2:30.11 |
| 27 | Kenneth Niemitalo | Completed | 2:30.84 |
| 28 | Cass Clawson | Completed | 2:31.40 |
| 29 | Nicholas Coolridge | Completed | 2:33.37 |
| 30 | Travis Rosen | Completed | 2:34.03 |
| 31 | Brian Beckstrand | Completed | 2:35.96 |
| 32 | Casey Suchocki | Completed | 2:37.15 |
| 33 | Geoff Lancaster | Completed | 2:39.58 |
| 34 | Thomas Doweidt | Completed | 2:43.76 |
| 35 | Ian Dory | Completed | 2:46.55 |
| 36 | Nate Burkhalter | Completed | 2:48.61 |
| 37 | Todd Bourgeois | Completed | 2:50.25 |
| 38 | James Wyatt | Completed | 2:54.15 |
| 39 | Najee Richardson | Completed | 2:54.33 |
| 40 | Brandon Mears | Completed | 2:55.01 |
| 41 | Jamie Rahn | Completed | 2:57.66 |
| 42 | Reko Rivera | Completed | 2:57.81 |
| 43 | An Ly | Completed | 2:58.10 |
| 44 | Danny Adair | Completed | 2:58.87 |
| 45 | Dan Polizzi | Completed | 3:00.78 |
| 46 | Eric Middleton | Completed | 3:01.80 |
| 47 | Jonathan Ruiz | Completed | 3:04.08 |
| 48 | Karsten Williams | Completed | 3:08.18 |
| 49 | Gabe Hurtado | Completed | 3:08.70 |
| 50 | Yuri Force | Completed | 3:09.89 |
| 51 | Theodore "TC" Tronquet | Completed | 3:12.47 |
| 52 | Ethan Swanson | Completed | 3:13.58 |
| 53 | Jo Jo Bynum | Completed | 3:14.81 |
| 54 | Jon Stewart | Completed | 3:18.67 |
| 55 | Dan Banura | Completed | 3:20.56 |
| 56 | Tyler Yamauchi | Completed | 3:21.70 |
| 57 | Shawn Richardson | Completed | 3:22.56 |
| 58 | Drew Knapp | Completed | 3:25.81 |
| 59 | Tremayne Dortch | Completed | 3:27.71 |
| 60 | Justin Hillsten | Completed | 3:28.90 |
| 61 | Zack Kemmerer | Completed | 3:30.77 |
| 62 | Ryan Robinson | Completed | 3:30.95 |
| 63 | Chad Hohn | Completed | 3:32.37 |
| 64 | Matt Wilder | Completed | 3:32.57 |
| 65 | Geoff Britten | Completed | 3:33.97 |
| 66 | Liam Buell | Completed | 3:34.24 |
| 67 | Eddy Stewart | Completed | 3:34.37 |
| 68 | Tyler Cravens | Completed | 3:35.69 |
| 69 | Tyler Smith | Completed | 3:36.27 |
| 70 | Jeff Harvey | Completed | 3:43.78 |
| 71 | Andrew Lowes | Completed | 3:47.09 |
| 72 | Mike Chick | Completed | 3:55.55 |
| 73 | Alexio Gomes | Completed | 4:04.91 |
| 74 | PJ Granger | Completed | 4:06.74 |
| 75 | Andrew "Roo" Yori | Completed | 4:10.22 |
| 76 | Brent Ruffin | Completed | 4:16.60 |
| 77 | Grant McCartney | Completed | 4:23.47 |
| 78 | Lucas Gomes | Completed | 4:25.41 |
| 79 | Jessie Graff | Completed | 4:27.84 |
| 80 | Kevin Hogan | Completed | 4:28.13 |
| 81 | Ryan Stratis | Completed | 4:29.12 |
| 82 | Josh Levin | Completed | 4:35.21 |
| 83 | Nick Hanson | Completed | 4:43.68 |
| 84 | Brian Kretsch | Completed | 4:45.30 |
| 85 | Ben Melick | Completed | 4:50.16 |
| 86 | Ryan Elliot | Completed | 4:58.25 |
| 87 | Jonathan Cooley | Completed | 5:00.43 |
| 88 | Joseph Greene II | Completed | 5:02.39 |
| 89 | Andrew Rowland | Completed | 5:17.80 |
| 90 | Ted Jung | Completed | 5:19.83 |
| 91 | Fred Thorne | Completed | 5:36.84 |
| 92 | Meagan Martin | Completed | 6:30.08 |
| 93 | Jerod Warf | Completed | 7:02.60 |
| 94 | Rudolfo Burgos | Failed | Warped Wall (2:09.51) |
| 95 | Adam Stroup | Failed | Warped Wall (2:51.01) |
| 96 | Hamidulah Khazi | Failed | Warped Wall (3:11.05) |
| 97 | Steve Seiver | Failed | Warped Wall (3:22.84) |
| 98 | Natalie Duran | Failed | Warped Wall (4:03.58) |
| 99 | Alex Bienz | Failed | Warped Wall (6:31.19) |
| 100 | Mike Bernardo | Failed | Rolling Thunder (0:51.58) |
| 101 | Bobby Bohannon | Failed | Pipefitter (0:58.68) |
| 102 | Adam Rayl | Failed | I-Beam Cross (0:58.91) |
| 103 | Chris DiGangi | Failed | Rolling Thunder (1:00.34) |
| 104 | Mike Soria | Failed | Rolling Thunder (1:03.14) |
| 105 | Chris Wilczewski | Failed | Rolling Thunder (1:03.78) |
| 106 | Alan Connealy | Failed | I-Beam Cross (1:04.24) |
| 107 | Jackson Meyer | Failed | I-Beam Cross (1:07.76) |
| 108 | Chris Moore | Failed | Pipefitter (1:08.10) |
| 109 | John Gowder Jr. | Failed | Rolling Thunder (1:09.16) |
| 110 | Jessell Boseman | Failed | Bar Hop (1:09.17) |
| 111 | Diron Jones | Failed | Bar Hop (1:12.50) |
| 112 | Lori Adams | Failed | Rolling Thunder (1:13.02) |
| 113 | Jesse La Flair | Failed | I-Beam Cross (1:17.12) |
| 114 | Jesse Cargill | Failed | I-Beam Cross (1:18.64) |
| 115 | Brandon Pannell | Failed | Rolling Thunder (1:20.97) |
| 116 | Michelle Warnky | Failed | Rolling Thunder (1:21.08) |
| 117 | Eric Torres | Failed | Rolling Thunder (1:21.97) |
| 118 | Yancey Quezada | Failed | Rolling Thunder (1:23.15) |
| 119 | Jonathan Cunanan | Failed | I-Beam Cross (1:23.88) |
| 120 | Tim Bream | Failed | Rolling Thunder (1:25.75) |
| 121 | Grey Kantor | Failed | I-Beam Cross (1:26.46) |
| 122 | Alex Smith | Failed | I-Beam Cross (1:29.64) |
| 123 | Richard Shoemaker | Failed | Rolling Thunder (1:30.84) |
| 124 | Andrew Potter | Failed | Bar Hop (1:33.15) |
| 125 | Ben Antoine | Failed | I-Beam Cross (1:37.46) |
| 126 | Nick Kostreski | Failed | Rolling Thunder (1:40.16) |
| 127 | Alex Dell'Aquila | Failed | Rolling Thunder (1:40.28) |
| 128 | Greg Fleming | Failed | Rolling Thunder (1:40.68) |
| 129 | K.C. Halik | Failed | I-Beam Cross (1:42.23) |
| 130 | Scott Willson | Failed | I-Beam Cross (1:42.71) |
| 131 | Fabio Figueiredo | Failed | Rolling Thunder (1:43.49) |
| 132 | Jared Brandy | Failed | Bar Hop (1:43.84) |
| 133 | Miles Avery | Failed | Rolling Thunder (1:46.64) |
| 134 | Mitch VeDepo | Failed | Bar Hop (1:51.64) |
| 135 | Carl Fantauzzo | Failed | Rolling Thunder (1:54.33) |
| 136 | Jesse Labreck | Failed | Rolling Thunder (1:58.05) |
| 137 | Brent Steffensen | Failed | Bar Hop (1:59.49) |
| 138 | Rachael Goldstein | Failed | Rolling Thunder (2:01.00) |
| 139 | Allyssa Beird | Failed | Rolling Thunder (2:04.46) |
| 140 | Bryce Foley | Failed | Swinging Spikes (2:07.82) |
| 141 | Reid Pletcher | Failed | Bar Hop (2:18.55) |
| 142 | Ben Jackson | Failed | Swinging Spikes (2:21.37) |
| 143 | Chris Moore | Failed | Bar Hop (2:22.10) |
| 144 | Dr. John Murray Adams | Failed | Swinging Spikes (2:32.99) |
| 145 | Brian Doom | Failed | Bar Hop (2:48.83) |
| 146 | Brian Burkhardt | Failed | Tire Swing (0:34.34) |
| 147 | Clayton Wolf | Failed | Tire Swing (0:35.31) |
| 148 | Sudul Diahkah | Failed | Tire Swing (0:50.70) |
| 149 | Grant Clinton | Failed | Tire Swing (0:51.53) |
| 150 | Alexander Moran | Failed | Tire Swing (0:53.01) |

== City Finals Leaderboard ==
| Order # | Competitor | Outcome | Obstacle/Result |
|---|---|---|---|
| 1 | James McGrath | Completed | 5:01.62 |
| 2 | Drew Drechsel | Completed | 5:05.26 |
| 3 | Daniel Gil | Completed | 5:14.27 |
| 4 | Adam Arnold | Completed | 5:40.42 |
| 5 | Grant Clinton | Completed | 5:57.43 |
| 6 | Jake Murray | Completed | 6:34.68 |
| 7 | Brian Arnold | Completed | 6:37.87 |
| 8 | Travis Rosen | Completed | 6:52.17 |
| 9 | Brett Sims | Completed | 7:36.45 |
| 10 | Ian Dory | Completed | 7:53.91 |
| 11 | Josh Levin | Completed | 8:21.30 |
| 12 | Chris Wilczewski | Failed | Invisible Ladder (3:33.53) |
| 13 | Thomas Stillings | Failed | Invisible Ladder (3:52.91) |
| 14 | Joe Moravsky | Failed | Invisible Ladder (4:02.73) |
| 15 | Ethan Swanson | Failed | Invisible Ladder (6:41.42) |
| 16 | Jon Alexis Jr. | Failed | Stair Hopper (2:56.69) |
| 17 | Casey Suchocki | Failed | The Clacker (3:24.45) |
| 18 | Mitch VeDepo | Failed | Window Hang (3:39.32) |
| 19 | Jamie Rahn | Failed | Stair Hopper (3:40.06) |
| 20 | Mike Bernardo | Failed | Stair Hopper (3:41.50) |
| 21 | Jon Stewart | Failed | Window Hang (3:41.71) |
| 22 | An Ly | Failed | Window Hang (3:45.99) |
| 23 | Thomas Doweidt | Failed | Window Hang (3:46.73) |
| 24 | Najee Richardson | Failed | Stair Hopper (3:54.70) |
| 25 | Michael Torres | Failed | Stair Hopper (3:56.24) |
| 26 | Dan Polizzi | Failed | Circuit Board (4:24.68) |
| 27 | Karsten Williams | Failed | Window Hang (4:27.40) |
| 28 | Geoff Britten | Failed | Stair Hopper (4:29.69) |
| 29 | Shawn Richardson | Failed | The Clacker (4:37.34) |
| 30 | Ryan Stratis | Failed | Stair Hopper (5:07.01) |
| 31 | Ryan Elliot | Failed | Circuit Board (5:24.47) |
| 32 | Jessie Graff | Failed | Circuit Board (6:07.36) |
| 33 | Jo Jo Bynum | Failed | Circuit Board (6:07.44) |
| 34 | Jesse Labreck | Failed | Stair Hopper (6:48.87) |
| 35 | Meagan Martin | Failed | Circuit Board (7:31.83) |
| 36 | Kevin Bull | Failed | The Wedge (2:34.03) |
| 37 | Neil Craver | Failed | Floating Monkey Bars (2:47.10) |
| 38 | Eric Middleton | Failed | Hourglass Drop (3:06.78) |
| 39 | Andrew Lowes | Failed | Bungee Road (3:16.31) |
| 40 | Dan Banura | Failed | Hourglass Drop (3:17.81) |
| 41 | Chris Workman | Failed | The Wedge (3:25.97) |
| 42 | Anthony DeFranco | Failed | Flying Shelf Grab (3:28.31) |
| 43 | Nicholas Coolridge | Failed | The Wedge (3:28.89) |
| 44 | Adam Rayl | Failed | The Wedge (3:34.93) |
| 45 | Flip Rodriguez | Failed | The Wedge (3:39.43) |
| 46 | Tyler Martin | Failed | Floating Monkey Bars (3:44.46) |
| 47 | Gabe Hurtado | Failed | The Wedge (3:46.56) |
| 48 | Chris Boehm | Failed | Floating Monkey Bars (3:51.21) |
| 49 | Yuri Force | Failed | Floating Monkey Bars (3:54.59) |
| 50 | Tyler Smith | Failed | Hourglass Drop (3:55.69) |
| 51 | Brent Steffensen | Failed | Bungee Road (4:00.61) |
| 52 | Liam Buell | Failed | The Wedge (4:04.51) |
| 53 | Grant McCartney | Failed | The Wedge (4:09.06) |
| 54 | Mike Chick | Failed | Floating Monkey Bars (4:09.59) |
| 55 | Alexio Gomes | Failed | Floating Monkey Bars (4:11.25) |
| 56 | Nick Kostreski | Failed | Flying Shelf Grab (4:11.65) |
| 57 | Tyler Yamauchi | Failed | Hourglass Drop (4:14.08) |
| 58 | Mack Roesch | Failed | Floating Monkey Bars (4:16.77) |
| 59 | Ryan Robinson | Failed | The Wedge (4:18.86) |
| 60 | Justin Hillsten | Failed | The Wedge (4:19.73) |
| 61 | Jackson Meyer | Failed | The Wedge (4:20.93) |
| 62 | Ben Jackson | Failed | Hourglass Drop (4:30.69) |
| 63 | Brandon Pannell | Failed | Flying Shelf Grab (4:31.09) |
| 64 | Todd Bourgeois | Failed | Floating Monkey Bars (4:33.40) |
| 65 | Matt Wilder | Failed | Hourglass Drop (4:35.22) |
| 66 | Nick Hanson | Failed | The Wedge (4:44.10) |
| 67 | Ben Melick | Failed | The Wedge (4:44.16) |
| 68 | Richard Shoemaker | Failed | Flying Shelf Grab (4:47.21) |
| 69 | James Wyatt | Failed | Bungee Road (4:54.59) |
| 70 | Andrew "Roo" Yori | Failed | Hourglass Drop (5:12.32) |
| 71 | Reid Pletcher | Failed | Bungee Road (5:21.97) |
| 72 | Carl Fantauzzo | Failed | Flying Shelf Grab (5:33.27) |
| 73 | Jessell Boseman | Failed | Salmon Ladder (2:01.91) |
| 74 | Clayton Wolf | Failed | Salmon Ladder (2:05.33) |
| 75 | Nate Burkhalter | Failed | Salmon Ladder (2:30.43) |

== National Finals ==
The National Finals were held along the Las Vegas strip, as has been the case since the series set up its own finals course instead of sending competitors to Japan.

=== Stage 1 ===
During the first episode of Stage 1, Jessie Graff became the first woman ever to successfully complete Stage 1 and advance to Stage 2. She placed 5th overall with a time of 2:07.61. She is the first woman in ANW history to make it to Stage 2. During the second episode of Stage 1, Jake Murray placed 1st overall with the fastest time of 1:45.25. Dan Polizzi, Nick Hanson, and Nick Kostreski cleared all the obstacles, but ran out of time before they could hit the buzzer at the end of Stage 1. Brent Steffensen, Travis Rosen, Ryan Stratis, James McGrath, Jamie Rahn, Mike Bernardo, Kevin Bull, Ian Dory, Jo Jo Bynum, and Geoff Britten surprisingly went out early on Stage 1 this season. Only a record-low 17 finishers have successfully completed the course.

Stage 1 featured four new obstacles, Snake Run, the Giant Log Grip, the Broken Bridge and the Flying Squirrel.

Competitors who completed Stage 1 are listed below.

| Order | Finalist | Outcome | Result |
|---|---|---|---|
| 1 | Jake Murray | Completed | 1:45.25 (POM Wonderful Run of the Night, Night 2) |
| 2 | Thomas Stillings | Completed | 1:52.44 |
| 3 | Daniel Gil | Completed | 2:04.97 |
| 4 | Brian Arnold | Completed | 2:05.90 |
| 5 | Jessie Graff | Completed | 2:07.61 (POM Wonderful Run of the Night, Night 1) |
| 6 | Neil Craver | Completed | 2:08.97 |
| 7 | Drew Drechsel | Completed | 2:11.22 |
| 8 | Nicholas Coolridge | Completed | 2:11.64 |
| 9 | Chris Wilczewski | Completed | 2:11.78 |
| 10 | Najee Richardson | Completed | 2:11.99 |
| 11 | Josh Levin | Completed | 2:12.24 |
| 12 | Grant McCartney | Completed | 2:15.19 |
| 13 | Flip Rodriguez | Completed | 2:15.22 |
| 14 | Adam Rayl | Completed | 2:15.26 |
| 15 | Joe Moravsky | Completed | 2:15.90 |
| 16 | Ethan Swanson | Completed | 2:17.90 |
| 17 | Michael Torres | Completed | 2:19.92 |

=== Stage 2 ===
Stage 2 featured five new obstacles, the Giant Ring Swing, the Down Up Salmon Ladder, the Wave Runner, the Double Wedge, and the Wall Flip.

Indicates competitor completed the course.
Indicates competitor was awarded the "POM Wonderful Run of the Night."

| Order | Finalist | Outcome | Notes |
|---|---|---|---|
| 1 | Michael Torres | 1. Giant Ring Swing | Failed to grab transition bar. |
| 2 | Najee Richardson | 2. Down Up Salmon Ladder | Failed ascent. |
| 3 | Ethan Swanson | 2. Down Up Salmon Ladder | Digest. Failed ascent. |
| 4 | Adam Rayl | 3. Wave Runner | Second board. |
| 5 | Josh Levin | 5. Double Wedge | Transition to second panel. |
| 6 | Grant McCartney | 2. Down Up Salmon Ladder | Transition to second side. |
| 7 | Neil Craver | 3. Wave Runner | First board. |
| 8 | Flip Rodriguez | 3. Wave Runner | Digest. Disqualified for skipping second board. |
| 9 | Chris Wilczewski | 5. Double Wedge | Second panel. |
| 10 | Joe Moravsky | 3. Wave Runner | First board. |
| 11 | Drew Drechsel * | FINISH (1.70 seconds left) | First to Clear Stage 2 (POM Wonderful Run of the Night) |
| 12 | Brian Arnold | 5. Double Wedge | First panel. |
| 13 | Thomas Stillings | 2. Down Up Salmon Ladder | Transition to second side. |
| 14 | Jake Murray | 5. Double Wedge | Transition to second panel. |
| 15 | Nicholas Coolridge | 3. Wave Runner | Digest. Bounced off landing platform. |
| 16 | Daniel Gil | FINISH (3.81 seconds left) | Fastest Stage 2 Clear |
| 17 | Jessie Graff | 3. Wave Runner | First board. |

- * Drew Drechsel was awarded the "POM Wonderful Run of the Night."

==== Leaderboard ====
| Order | Finalist | Outcome | Result |
|---|---|---|---|
| 1 | Daniel Gil | Completed | 3:26.19 |
| 2 | Drew Drechsel | Completed | 3:28.30 |

=== Stage 3 ===
Stage 3 featured two new obstacles, the Keylock Hang and the Curved Body Prop

| Order | Finalist | Outcome | Notes |
|---|---|---|---|
| 1 | Drew Drechsel | 5. Hang Climb | Lost grip after accidentally grabbing a foothold. |
| 2 | Daniel Gil | 3. Ultimate Cliffhanger | Transition to second floating ledge. |

== U.S. Nielsen ratings ==
| No. in season | Episode | Air date | Timeslot | Rating/Share (18–49) | | Viewers (millions) | Nightly rank | Weekly rank | DVR 18-49 | DVR Viewers (millions) | Total 18-49 | Total Viewers |
|---|---|---|---|---|---|---|---|---|---|---|---|---|
| 1 | "Los Angeles Qualifier" | June 1, 2016 | Wednesday 9:00 p.m. | 1.7 | 7 | 6.35 | 1 | 6 | 0.5 | 1.20 | 2.2 | 7.55 |
| 2 | "Atlanta Qualifier" | June 8, 2016 | Wednesday 9:00 p.m. | 1.6 | 6 | 5.80 | 2 | 8 | 0.4 | 1.16 | 2.0 | 6.96 |
| 3 | "Indianapolis Qualifier" | June 13, 2016 | Monday 8:00 p.m. | 1.9 | 6 | 6.84 | 2 | 8 | 0.5 | 1.29 | 2.4 | 8.13 |
| 4 | "Oklahoma City Qualifier" | June 20, 2016 | Monday 8:00 p.m. | 1.8 | 7 | 6.54 | 2 | 4 | 0.4 | 1.08 | 2.2 | 7.61 |
| 5 | "Philadelphia Qualifier" | June 27, 2016 | Monday 9:00 p.m. | 1.9 | 7 | 6.32 | 2 | 3 | 0.3 | 0.81 | 2.2 | 7.13 |
| 6 | "Los Angeles Finals" | July 11, 2016 | Monday 8:00 p.m. | 1.8 | 7 | 6.34 | 2 | 6 | 0.3 | 1.04 | 2.1 | 7.38 |
| 7 | "Atlanta Finals" | July 18, 2016 | Monday 8:00 p.m. | 1.8 | 7 | 6.00 | 2 | 5 | —N/a | —N/a | —N/a | —N/a |
| 8 | "Indianapolis Finals" | July 25, 2016 | Monday 8:00 p.m. | 1.6 | 6 | 5.90 | 2 | 7 | 0.2 | 0.58 | 1.8 | 6.48 |
| 9 | "Oklahoma City Finals" | August 1, 2016 | Monday 8:00 p.m. | 1.6 | 6 | 5.86 | 3 | 10 | 0.3 | 0.67 | 1.9 | 6.53 |
| 10 | "Philadelphia Finals" | August 22, 2016 | Monday 8:00 p.m. | 2.0 | 7 | 7.01 | 1 | 5 | 0.3 | 0.96 | 2.3 | 7.96 |
| 11 | "National Finals (week 1)" | August 29, 2016 | Monday 8:00 p.m. | 1.9 | 7 | 7.01 | 1 | 5 | —N/a | —N/a | —N/a | —N/a |
| 12 | "National Finals (week 2)" | September 5, 2016 | Monday 8:00 p.m. | 1.6 | 5 | 5.81 | 1 | 14 | —N/a | —N/a | —N/a | —N/a |
| 13 | "National Finals (week 3)" | September 12, 2016 | Monday 8:00 p.m. | 1.7 | 6 | 5.88 | 2 | 15 | —N/a | —N/a | —N/a | —N/a |
