= POM Wonderful =

American pomegranate and beverage company

POM Wonderful, LLC
- Type: Privately held company
- Industry: Foods
- Founded: 2002
- Founder: Stewart and Lynda Rae Resnick
- Headquarters: Los Angeles, California, United States
- Key people: Derrick Miller (President)
- Products: Fruit juices, tea, fresh pomegranate arils
- Parent: The Wonderful Company
- Website: POM Wonderful website

POM Wonderful, LLC is a private company which sells an eponymous brand of pomegranate juices, pomegranate arils, and teas. It was founded in 2002 by the billionaire industrial agriculture couple Stewart and Lynda Rae Resnick. POM Wonderful is one of several food brands held within The Wonderful Company owned and managed by the Resnicks.

== Products ==
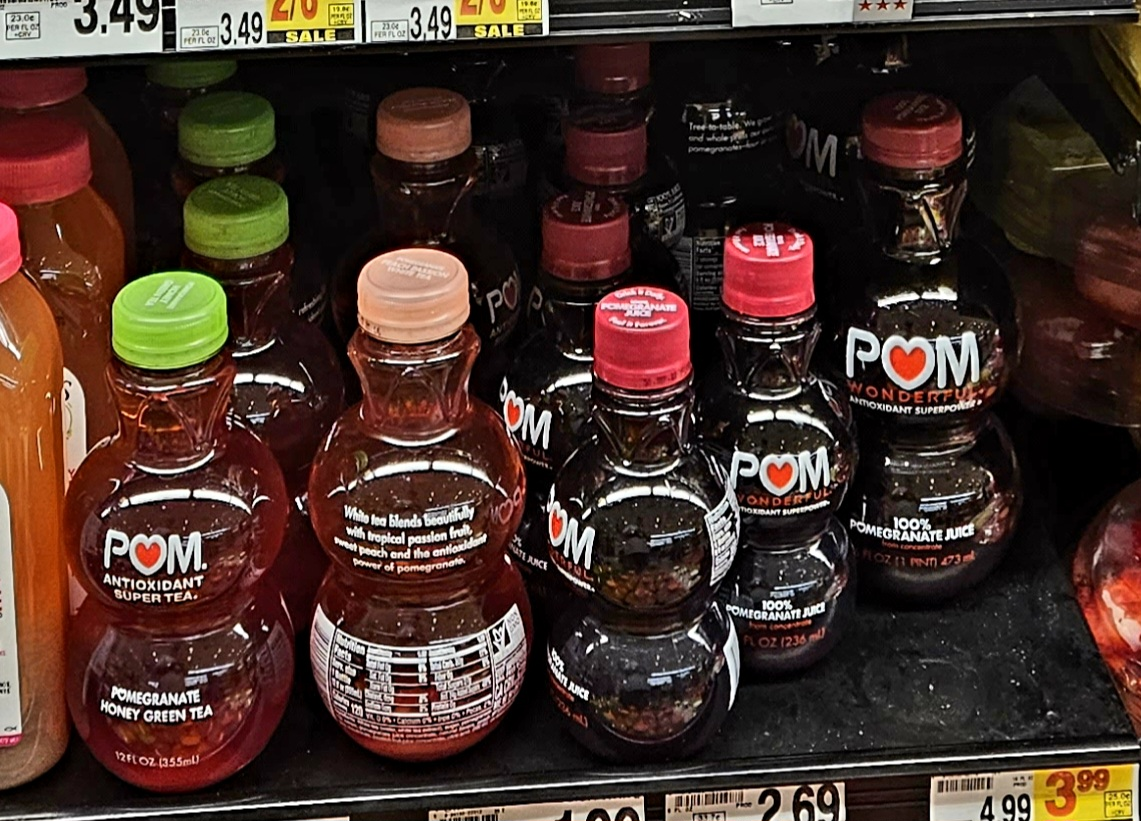
Bottles of POM Wonderful juice.

The company's main product is pomegranate juice, which is sold in a trademark "double-bulb" bottle with the product name, POM, featured in capital letters where the O is substituted by a heart symbol. The company also manufactures blended juice beverages, such as pomegranate juice mixed with juices of blueberry, cranberry, cherry, mango or tangerine, bottled tea, and fresh pomegranate arils.

In 2017, POM Wonderful acquired the pomegranate distributor Ruby Fresh.

=== The fruit ===
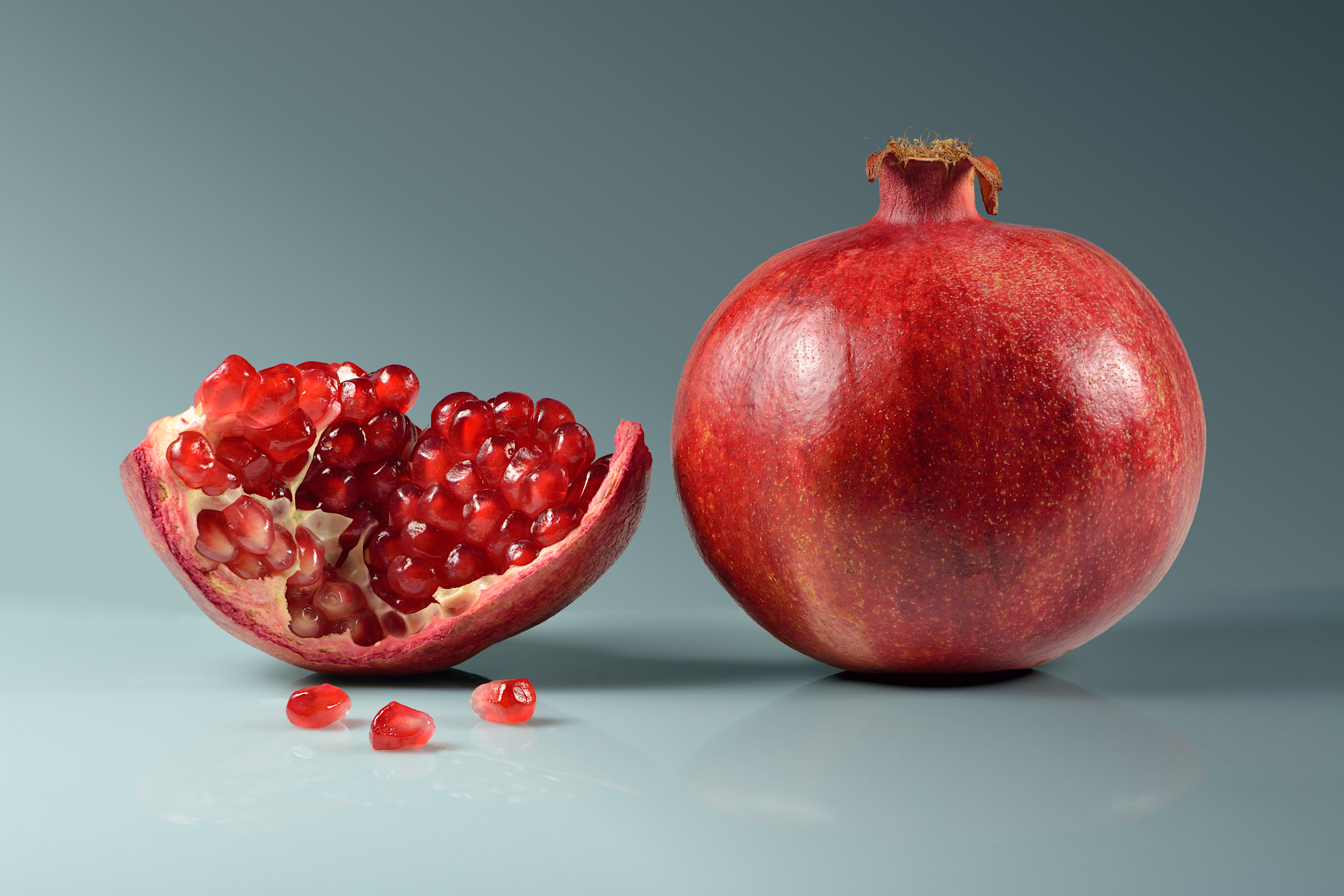
Pomegranate

The brand name "POM Wonderful" refers to the "Wonderful" cultigen of pomegranate grown in the central and southern San Joaquin Valley of Central California. It is the leading commercial variety in California, being well-suited for juicing with its soft seeds, high water content, and wine-like flavor. POM branded products are produced from fruit obtained from their own corporate orchards, and other orchards in the same area. The company employs a proprietary process in their own facilities to mechanically extract juice for various pomegranate-based products.

== Legal actions ==
=== FTC cease and desist order ===
On February 23, 2010, the U.S. Food and Drug Administration (FDA) informed the company in a warning letter that POM Wonderful was "[promoting] (POM Wonderful 100% Pomegranate Juice) for conditions that cause the product to be a drug". POM's labeling as a food was also criticized in the letter due to a product claim of being "full of antioxidants called phytochemicals" and having "uniquely high levels of powerful antioxidants".

Such nutrient content claims on food must have a scientifically validated Dietary Reference Intake value and the names of such nutrients included. According to the FDA, simply using the terms "antioxidants" and "phytochemicals" is not specific enough for food nutrient labeling requirements because phytochemicals in pomegranate juice have not yet been defined with actual physiological properties in humans.

FDA contended that if the manufacturer desires to market its products with claims for the cure, mitigation, treatment, or prevention of disease, the product is subject to the typical scientific rigor of the drug approval process to achieve such claims.

In September 2010, the Federal Trade Commission issued an administrative complaint against POM Wonderful saying it had made "false and unsubstantiated claims that their products will prevent or treat heart disease, prostate cancer, and erectile dysfunction."

POM is quoted as responding that "all statements made in connection with POM products are true ... and as strong advocates of honest labeling and fair advertising, we are looking forward to working with the agency to resolve this matter."

On May 22, 2012, Chief Administrative Law Judge Michael Chappell ruled after a hearing that the company's claims were deceptive and issued a cease and desist order effective for 20 years.

The greater weight of the persuasive expert testimony demonstrates that there is insufficient competent and reliable scientific evidence to substantiate claims that the Pom products treat, prevent or reduce the risk of erectile dysfunction or that they are clinically proven to do so.

[POM Wonderful] shall not make any representation, in any manner, expressly or by implication, including through the use of a product name, endorsement, depiction, illustration, trademark or trade name, about the health benefits, performance or efficacy of any covered product, unless the representation is nonmisleading.

The May 22, 2012 Administrative Law Judge upheld two of POM's positions: (1) any FDA pre-approval requirement "would constitute unnecessary overreaching" and that (2) more stringent double-blind, randomized, placebo-controlled studies were not necessary.

In January 2015, The U.S. Court of Appeals for the D.C. Circuit upheld most of the FTC's 2010 order. The appellate court said that many of POM's ads "mischaracterized the scientific evidence concerning the health benefits of Pom's products with regard to those diseases."

In May 2016, the FTC and a U.S. federal court decided that POM cannot make health claims in its advertising, and the U.S. Supreme Court declined POM's request to review the court ruling that upheld the FTC decision. FTC Chairwoman Edith Ramirez agreed with the Supreme Court's decision by stating: "I am pleased that the POM Wonderful case has been brought to a successful conclusion. The outcome of this case makes clear that companies like POM making serious health claims about food and nutritional supplement products must have rigorous scientific evidence to back them up. Consumers deserve no less."

=== Minute Maid lawsuit ===
From 2008 through 2014, POM litigated against The Coca-Cola Company's subsidiary, Minute Maid. The lawsuit claimed that the name of the product called Minute Maid Pomegranate Blueberry Flavored Blend of five juices was misleading because it contained 0.3% pomegranate juice and 99.4% apple juice. The case went to the U.S. Supreme Court, which decided in June 2014 that a lawsuit for false advertising claims could be pursued against Coca-Cola, saying "Competitors may bring Lanham Act claims like POM's challenging food and beverage labels regulated by the FDCA." Legal analysts anticipate several more years of litigation on issues not argued in the Supreme Court, such as cause and magnitude of financial or brand injury to POM Wonderful resulting from the Minute Maid product.

== The Greatest Movie Ever Sold ==
The company, product, executives and owner Lynda Resnick were featured in a 2011 documentary about product placement, marketing and advertising in movies and TV shows. The film was entitled POM Wonderful Presents: The Greatest Movie Ever Sold. POM agreed to pay one million dollars (subject to certain conditions) for "above-the-title" billing on the film.

== External reading ==
- Office of Administrative Law Judges, D. Michael Chappell (May 17, 2012). "Docket No. 9344, In the Matter of Pom Wonderful LLC and Roll Global LLC, and Stewart A. Resnick, Lynda Rae Resnick, and Matthew Tupper, Respondents" (PDF). Federal Trade Commission.
