= American Ninja Warrior season 5 =

Season of American reality/sport competition television series American Ninja Warrior

American Ninja Warrior
- Season 5
- Hosted by: Matt Iseman; Akbar Gbaja-Biamila; Jenn Brown
- Finals venue: Las Vegas, NV
- No. of episodes: 21

Release
- Original network: NBC; G4
- Original release: June 30 – September 16, 2013

Season chronology
- ← Previous; Season 4 Next → Season 6

The fifth season of American Ninja Warrior premiered on G4 on June 30, 2013, with subsequent shows airing on both G4 and NBC. Host Matt Iseman returned for his fifth season, while newcomers Akbar Gbaja-Biamila and Jenn Brown replaced skier Jonny Moseley and Angela Sun. Similar to previous seasons, the winner receives $500,000 and the coveted title, "American Ninja Warrior". This also marks the second season Mount Midoriyama was held on U.S. soil.

== Cities ==
In addition to the four cities (Venice Beach, Baltimore, Miami, and Denver), the national finals were once again held in Las Vegas, Nevada.

== Obstacles ==
=== City Qualifying & Finals ===
Event		Obstacles										Finishers
Venice Beach	Qualifying	Quintuple Steps	Frame Slider	Domino Hill	Floating Chains	Flying Nunchucks	Warped Wall	N/A				17
Venice Beach	Finals	Quintuple Steps	Frame Slider	Domino Hill	Floating Chains	Trapeze Swing	Warped Wall	Salmon Ladder	Rope Maze	Cliffhanger	Spider Climb	4
Baltimore	Qualifying	Quintuple Steps	Downhill Jump	Prism Tilt	Swing Jump	Circle Cross	Warped Wall	N/A				26
Baltimore	Finals	Quintuple Steps	Downhill Jump	Prism Tilt	Swing Jump	Circle Cross	Warped Wall	Salmon Ladder	Rumbling Dice	Body Prop	Spider Climb	9
Miami	Qualifying	Quintuple Steps	Utility Pole Slider	Balance Bridge	Slider Jump	Monkey Peg	Warped Wall	N/A				19
Miami	Finals	Quintuple Steps	Utility Pole Slider	Balance Bridge	Slider Jump	Monkey Peg	Warped Wall	Salmon Ladder	Ledge Jump	Rolling Steel	Spider Climb	8
Denver	Qualifying	Quintuple Steps	Rolling Log	Rotating Bridge	Jump Hang Kai	Grip Hang	Warped Wall	N/A				48
Denver	Finals	Quintuple Steps	Rolling Log	Rotating Bridge	Jump Hang Kai	Grip Hang	Warped Wall	Salmon Ladder	Floating Stairs	Pole Grasper	Spider Climb	5

=== National Finals ===
Event	Obstacle(s)								Finishers
Stage 1	Timbers	Giant Cycle	Rope Glider	Jumping Spider	Half Pipe Attack	Warped Wall	Spinning Bridge	Final Climb	21
Stage 2	Hang Slider	Double Salmon Ladder	Unstable Bridge	Balance Tank	Metal Spin	Wall Lift			7
Stage 3	Roulette Cylinder	Doorknob Grasper	Floating Boards	Ultimate Cliffhanger	Bungee Rope Climb	Hang Climb	Spider Flip	Flying Bar	0
Stage 4	Rope Climb								N/A

== City Qualifying ==
Tryouts for the fifth season of American Ninja Warrior commenced in February 2013 and took place in the following cities to determine the 100 competitors to compete participate in the qualifying rounds: Venice Beach, CA, Baltimore, MD, Miami, FL, and Denver, CO. The last of the qualifying rounds concluded in May 2013. The top 30 competitors that went the farthest the fastest would move on to the finals rounds, but all finishers are guaranteed a spot in the next round.

=== Venice Beach Qualifying ===
Order #	Competitor	Outcome	Obstacle/Result
1	Jesse La Flair	Completed	1:04.30
2	Shane Daniels	Completed	1:14.05
3	David Campbell	Completed	1:21.07
4	Lance Pekus	Completed	1:23.54
5	James McGrath	Completed	1:32.38
6	Jonathan Roberson	Completed	1:32.78
7	Brian Kretsch	Completed	1:45.98
8	Dustin Rocho	Completed	1:53.33
9	Andrew Douglas	Completed	1:56.58
10	Noah Kaufman	Completed	2:10.18
11	Brent Steffensen	Completed	2:18.45
12	Justin Walcker	Completed	2:26.95
13	James Sclar	Completed	2:43.06
14	James Eggiman	Completed	2:43.07
15	Travis Brewer	Completed	2:49.89
16	Forest Chang-Turpin	Completed	3:10.90
17	Yen Chen	Completed	4:26.04
18	Tony Reddick	Failed	Flying Nunchucks (0:53.26)
19	Joseph Wilson	Failed	Flying Nunchucks (0:53.51)
20	Paul Darnell	Failed	Flying Nunchucks (1:00.52)
21	JB Douglas	Failed	Flying Nunchucks (1:01.80)
22	Mario Mendoza	Failed	Flying Nunchucks (1:02.27)
23	Daniel Dick	Failed	Flying Nunchucks (1:03.15)
24	Ryan Thompson	Failed	Flying Nunchucks (1:04.10)
25	Levi Keller	Failed	Flying Nunchucks (1:04.13)
26	Dan Mast	Failed	Flying Nunchucks (1:05.03)
27	Luke Carson	Failed	Flying Nunchucks (1:10.06)
28	John Sanders	Failed	Flying Nunchucks (1:12.80)
29	Will Roberts	Failed	Flying Nunchucks (1:16.16)
30	Jessie Graff	Failed	Flying Nunchucks (1:19.78)

=== Baltimore Qualifying ===
Order #	Competitor	Outcome	Obstacle/Result
1	Elet Hall	Completed	0:53.79
2	Michael Needham	Completed	1:14.51
3	Jamie Rahn	Completed	1:19.78
4	Tim Shieff	Completed	1:22.31
5	Dan Galiczynski	Completed	1:23.43
6	Joe Moravsky	Completed	1:25.95
7	Robin Pietschmann	Completed	1:28.75
8	Andrew Karsen	Completed	1:34.36
9	Tony Torres	Completed	1:38.00
10	Michael Silenzi	Completed	1:38.98
11	Andrew Lowes	Completed	1:38.98
12	Brian Wilczewski	Completed	1:39.98
13	Michael Bernardo	Completed	1:41.42
14	Dan "Hot Dog" Moschella	Completed	1:47.61
15	Marc Namie	Completed	1:49.90
16	Brandon Mears	Completed	1:53.56
17	Robert Hoover	Completed	1:53.72
18	David Slovenski	Completed	1:55.78
19	Jeffery Tan	Completed	2:00.66
20	Seth Caskey	Completed	2:00.85
21	Chris DiGangi	Completed	2:01.05
22	Travis Weinand	Completed	2:05.50
23	Adam Grossman	Completed	2:05.59
24	Michael Pericoloso	Completed	2:16.08
25	Dan Polizzi	Completed	2:47.77
26	Justin Conway	Completed	2:50.27
27	Stephen Pullen	Failed	Warped Wall (1:32.74)
28	Michael Fedo	Failed	Warped Wall (1:36.00)
29	Douglas Chick	Failed	Warped Wall (1:48.84)
30	Robert McFarlane	Failed	Circle Cross (0:36.59)

=== Miami Qualifying ===
Order #	Competitor	Outcome	Obstacle/Result
1	Drew Drechsel	Completed	1:08.29
2	David "Flip" Rodriguez	Completed	1:27.66
3	Travis Rosen	Completed	1:29.97
4	Joshua Romeo	Completed	1:35.56
5	William Brown	Completed	1:36.80
6	Thomas Hall	Completed	1:46.50
7	Sean Morris	Completed	1:49.53
8	Grant David	Completed	1:53.76
9	Yev Kouchnir	Completed	1:58.70
10	Spencer Schneider	Completed	2:07.49
11	Joseph Rosello	Completed	2:13.73
12	Pavel Manin	Completed	2:21.45
13	John Walker	Completed	2:22.29
14	James Perreira	Completed	2:30.09
15	Joshua Windbeck	Completed	2:30.90
16	Ryan Stratis	Completed	2:37.60
17	Paul O'Conner	Completed	2:49.55
18	Fernando Vazquez	Completed	3:04.41
19	Brandon Arrington	Completed	3:05.50
20	Jonathan Sharp Brown	Failed	Warped Wall (1:04.71)
21	Brian Escarsega	Failed	Warped Wall (1:11.83)
22	Tukrong Klengdong	Failed	Warped Wall (1:16.61)
23	Idoko Abuh	Failed	Warped Wall (1:18.04)
24	Brandon Smith	Failed	Warped Wall (1:26.15)
25	David Gilbert	Failed	Warped Wall (1:37.40)
26	Sean Bennett	Failed	Warped Wall (1:40.45)
27	Jason Soares	Failed	Warped Wall (1:45.73)
28	Chad Hudson	Failed	Warped Wall (2:07.83)
29	Sean Nogues	Failed	Warped Wall (2:20.01)
30	Edgardo Osorio	Failed	Warped Wall (3:03.92)

=== Denver Qualifying ===
Order #	Competitor	Outcome	Obstacle/Result
1	Brandon Douglass	Completed	0:46.50
2	Amos Rendao	Completed	0:55.00
3	Jake Smith	Completed	0:55.73
4	Christopher Romrell	Completed	0:59.19
5	Paul Kasemir	Completed	0:59.90
6	Lorin Ball	Completed	1:02.52
7	Casey Finley	Completed	1:08.41
8	Caleb Garnham	Completed	1:14.05
9	Josh Cook	Completed	1:14.59
10	Trevor Vaughn	Completed	1:25.86
11	Camilo Brokaw	Completed	1:27.06
12	Brian Arnold	Completed	1:30.14
13	Connor Moyer	Completed	1:34.50
14	Noah Mittman	Completed	1:34.62
15	Kyle Sinacori	Completed	1:34.65
16	Jeremy Hanson	Completed	1:35.08
17	Joshua Grant	Completed	1:39.75
18	Tremayne Dortch	Completed	1:40.46
19	Colby Frontiero	Completed	1:40.95
20	Isaac Caldiero	Completed	1:42.07
21	Chris Calhoun	Completed	1:44.45
22	Stephen Volcko	Completed	1:45.07
23	Graham Watanabe	Completed	1:50.03
24	Jim Eckhart	Completed	1:50.39
25	Andrew Treble	Completed	1:51.19
26	Andres De La Rosa	Completed	1:52.28
27	Jason Sawyer	Completed	1:52.91
28	Jehan Martinez	Completed	1:53.58
29	Alexander Nicholas	Completed	1:55.64
30	James Winter	Completed	1:55.90
31	Logan Dooley	Completed	1:56.02
32	Matthew Derouen	Completed	1:56.85
33	Micah Soelberg	Completed	1:57.01
34	Keith Peters	Completed	1:57.15
35	Jason Williams	Completed	1:58.40
36	Joel Wymore	Completed	2:00.26
37	LeEarl Rugland	Completed	2:01.66
38	Terry Cossey	Completed	2:01.77
39	Spenser Labatt	Completed	2:02.28
40	Josh Kronberg	Completed	2:03.14
41	Alan Moreno	Completed	2:04.36
42	Sam Sann	Completed	2:04.90
43	Rashad Richardson	Completed	2:05.15
44	Adam Parkhurst	Completed	2:29.94
45	Jose Rodriguez	Completed	2:31.02
46	Brady Dunkley	Completed	2:50.45
47	Travis Paecht	Completed	3:07.76
48	Johnathan Morin	Completed	3:16.75

=== Qualifying Leaderboard ===
Order #	Competitor	Outcome	Obstacle/Result
1	Brandon Douglass	Completed	0:46.50
2	Elet Hall	Completed	0:53.79
3	Amos Rendao	Completed	0:55.00
4	Jake Smith	Completed	0:55.73
5	Christopher Romrell	Completed	0:59.19
6	Paul Kasemir	Completed	0:59.90
7	Lorin Ball	Completed	1:02.52
8	Jesse La Flair	Completed	1:04.30
9	Drew Drechsel	Completed	1:08.29
10	Casey Finley	Completed	1:08.41
11	Shane Daniels	Completed	1:14.05
12	Caleb Garnham	Completed	1:14.05
13	Michael Needham	Completed	1:14.51
14	Josh Cook	Completed	1:14.59
15	Jamie Rahn	Completed	1:19.78
16	David Campbell	Completed	1:21.07
17	Tim Shieff	Completed	1:22.31
18	Dan Galiczynski	Completed	1:23.43
19	Lance Pekus	Completed	1:23.54
20	Trevor Vaughn	Completed	1:25.86
21	Joe Moravsky	Completed	1:25.95
22	Camillo Brokaw	Completed	1:27.06
23	David "Flip" Rodriguez	Completed	1:27.66
24	Robin Pietschmann	Completed	1:28.75
25	Travis Rosen	Completed	1:29.97
26	Brian Arnold	Completed	1:30.14
27	James McGrath	Completed	1:32.38
28	Jonathan Roberson	Completed	1:32.78
29	Andrew Karsen	Completed	1:34.36
30	Connor Moyer	Completed	1:34.50
31	Noah Mittman	Completed	1:34.62
32	Kyle Sinacori	Completed	1:34.65
33	Jeremy Hanson	Completed	1:35.08
34	Joshua Romeo	Completed	1:35.56
35	William Brown	Completed	1:36.80
36	Tony Torres	Completed	1:38.00
37	Michael Silenzi	Completed	1:38.98
38	Andrew Lowes	Completed	1:38.98
39	Joshua Grant	Completed	1:39.75
40	Brian Wilczewski	Completed	1:39.98
41	Tremayne Dortch	Completed	1:40.46
42	Colby Frontiero	Completed	1:40.95
43	Michael Bernardo	Completed	1:41.42
44	Isaac Caldiero	Completed	1:42.07
45	Chris Calhoun	Completed	1:44.45
46	Stephen Volcko	Completed	1:45.07
47	Brian Kretsch	Completed	1:45.98
48	Thomas Hall	Completed	1:46.50
49	Dan "Hot Dog" Moschella	Completed	1:47.61
50	Sean Morris	Completed	1:49.53
51	Marc Namie	Completed	1:49.90
52	Graham Watanabe	Completed	1:50.03
53	Jim Eckhart	Completed	1:50.39
54	Andrew Treble	Completed	1:51.19
55	Andres De La Rosa	Completed	1:52.28
56	Jason Sawyer	Completed	1:52.91
57	Dustin Rocho	Completed	1:53.33
58	Brandon Mears	Completed	1:53.56
59	Jehan Martinez	Completed	1:53.58
60	Robert Hoover	Completed	1:53.72
61	Grant David	Completed	1:53.76
62	Andrew Douglas	Completed	1:55.58
63	Alexander Nicholas	Completed	1:55.64
64	David Slovenski	Completed	1:55.78
65	James Winter	Completed	1:55.90
66	Logan Dooley	Completed	1:56.02
67	Matthew Derouen	Completed	1:56.85
68	Micah Soelberg	Completed	1:57.01
69	Keith Peters	Completed	1:57.15
70	Jason Williams	Completed	1:58.40
71	Yev Kouchnir	Completed	1:58.70
72	Joel Wymore	Completed	2:00.26
73	Jeffery Tan	Completed	2:00.66
74	Seth Caskey	Completed	2:00.85
75	Chris DiGangi	Completed	2:01.05
76	LeEarl Rugland	Completed	2:01.66
77	Terry Cossey	Completed	2:01.77
78	Spenser Labatt	Completed	2:02.28
79	Josh Kronberg	Completed	2:03.14
80	Alan Moreno	Completed	2:04.36
81	Sam Sann	Completed	2:04.90
82	Rashad Richardson	Completed	2:05.15
83	Travis Weinand	Completed	2:05.50
84	Adam Grossman	Completed	2:05.59
85	Spencer Schneider	Completed	2:07.49
86	Noah Kaufman	Completed	2:10.18
87	Joseph Rosello	Completed	2:13.73
88	Michael Pericoloso	Completed	2:16.08
89	Brent Steffensen	Completed	2:18.45
90	Pavel Manin	Completed	2:21.45
91	John Walker	Completed	2:22.29
92	Justin Walcker	Completed	2:26.95
93	Adam Parkhurst	Completed	2:29.94
94	James Perreira	Completed	2:30.09
95	Joshua Windbeck	Completed	2:30.90
96	Jose Rodriguez	Completed	2:31.02
97	Ryan Stratis	Completed	2:37.60
98	James Sclar	Completed	2:43.06
99	James Eggiman	Completed	2:43.07
100	Dan Polizzi	Completed	2:47.77
101	Paul O'Connor	Completed	2:49.55
102	Travis Brewer	Completed	2:49.89
103	Justin Conway	Completed	2:50.27
104	Brady Dunkley	Completed	2:50.45
105	Fernando Vazquez	Completed	3:04.41
106	Brandon Arrington	Completed	3:05.50
107	Travis Paecht	Completed	3:07.76
108	Forest Chang-Turpin	Completed	3:10.90
109	Johnathan Morin	Completed	3:16.75
110	Yen Chen	Completed	4:26.04
111	Jonathan Sharp Brown	Failed	Warped Wall (1:04.71)
112	Brian Escarsega	Failed	Warped Wall (1:11.83)
113	Tukrong Klengdong	Failed	Warped Wall (1:16.61)
114	Idoko Abuh	Failed	Warped Wall (1:18.04)
115	Brandon Smith	Failed	Warped Wall (1:26.15)
116	Stephen Pullen	Failed	Warped Wall (1:32.74)
117	Michael Fedo	Failed	Warped Wall (1:36.00)
118	David Gilbert	Failed	Warped Wall (1:37.40)
119	Sean Bennett	Failed	Warped Wall (1:40.45)
120	Jason Soares	Failed	Warped Wall (1:45.73)
121	Douglas Chick	Failed	Warped Wall (1:48.84)
122	Chad Hudson	Failed	Warped Wall (2:07.83)
123	Sean Nogues	Failed	Warped Wall (2:20.01)
124	Edgardo Osorio	Failed	Warped Wall (3:03.92)
125	Robert McFarlane	Failed	Circle Cross (0:36.59)
126	Tony Reddick	Failed	Flying Nunchucks (0:53.26)
127	Joseph Wilson	Failed	Flying Nunchucks (0:53.51)
128	Paul Darnell	Failed	Flying Nunchucks (1:00.52)
129	JB Douglas	Failed	Flying Nunchucks (1:01.80)
130	Mario Mendoza	Failed	Flying Nunchucks (1:02.27)
131	Daniel Dick	Failed	Flying Nunchucks (1:03.15)
132	Ryan Thompson	Failed	Flying Nunchucks (1:04.10)
133	Levi Keller	Failed	Flying Nunchucks (1:04.13)
134	Dan Mast	Failed	Flying Nunchucks (1:05.03)
135	Luke Carson	Failed	Flying Nunchucks (1:10.06)
136	John Sanders	Failed	Flying Nunchucks (1:12.80)
137	Will Roberts	Failed	Flying Nunchucks (1:16.16)
138	Jessie Graff	Failed	Flying Nunchucks (1:19.78)

== City Finals ==
The 30 competitors from qualifying in each city tackled an extended course, featuring four new additional obstacles like the Salmon Ladder and Spider Climb. The top 15 competitors that went the farthest the fastest would move on to the national finals in Las Vegas.

=== Venice Beach Finals ===
Order #	Competitor	Outcome	Obstacle/Result
1	James McGrath	Completed	3:14.40
2	Dustin Rocho	Completed	3:48.50
3	JB Douglas	Completed	3:52.10
4	David Campbell	Completed	4:25.17
5	James Eggiman	Failed	Spider Climb (2:40.05)
6	James Sclar	Failed	Spider Climb (2:50.00)
7	Jesse La Flair	Failed	Cliffhanger (2:32.73)
8	Dan Mast	Failed	Cliffhanger (2:44.77)
9	Brian Kretsch	Failed	Cliffhanger (2:49.07)
10	Luke Carson	Failed	Cliffhanger (2:50.14)
11	Lance Pekus	Failed	Cliffhanger (2:51.23)
12	Justin Walcker	Failed	Cliffhanger (3:46.06)
13	Levi Keller	Failed	Rope Maze (1:34.47)
14	Mario Mendoza	Failed	Rope Maze (2:19.10)
15	Will Roberts	Failed	Rope Maze (3:21.13)

=== Baltimore Finals ===
Order #	Competitor	Outcome	Obstacle/Result
1	Dan Galiczynski	Completed	3:10.90
2	Joe Moravsky	Completed	3:11.27
3	Brian Wilczewski	Completed	3:13.17
4	Michael Silenzi	Completed	3:19.07
5	Jeffery Tan	Completed	3:23.17
6	Andrew Lowes	Completed	3:33.37
7	Dan Moschella	Completed	3:37.73
8	Jamie Rahn	Completed	3:44.47
9	David Slovenski	Completed	3:50.30
10	Tim Shieff	Failed	Body Prop (1:58.50)
11	Michael Needham	Failed	Body Prop (2:15.67)
12	Travis Weinand	Failed	Body Prop (2:29.77)
13	Adam Grossman	Failed	Body Prop (3:24.54)
14	Michael Pericoloso	Failed	Body Prop (3:31.17)
15	Seth Caskey	Failed	Body Prop (4:00.74)

=== Miami Finals ===
Order #	Competitor	Outcome	Obstacle/Result
1	Drew Drechsel	Completed	2:29.93
2	Flip Rodriguez	Completed	2:31.00
3	William Brown	Completed	3:17.50
4	Travis Rosen	Completed	3:20.67
5	Tukrong Klengdong	Completed	3:26.73
6	Yev Kouchnir	Completed	3:30.00
7	Jason Soares	Completed	4:02.43
8	Ryan Stratis	Completed	4:04.90
9	Grant David	Failed	Rolling Steel (2:41.20)
10	Idoko Abuh	Failed	Rolling Steel (2:42.15)
11	Brandon Smith	Failed	Salmon Ladder (1:21.00)
12	Jonathan Sharp Brown	Failed	Salmon Ladder (1:24.00)
13	Joseph Rosello	Failed	Salmon Ladder (1:33.70)
14	John Walker	Failed	Salmon Ladder (1:45.37)
15	Josh Romeo	Failed	Salmon Ladder (1:46.88)

=== Denver Finals ===
Order #	Competitor	Outcome	Obstacle/Result
1	Paul Kasemir	Completed	3:19.50
2	Josh Cook	Completed	3:47.83
3	Brian Arnold	Completed	3:50.43
4	Isaac Caldiero	Completed	4:03.43
5	Colby Frontiero	Completed	4:17.20
6	Casey Finley	Failed	Pole Grasper (2:00.57)
7	Tremayne Dortch	Failed	Pole Grasper (2:21.93)
8	Kyle Sinacori	Failed	Pole Grasper (2:25.17)
9	Andres De La Rosa	Failed	Pole Grasper (3:01.22)
10	Christopher Romwell	Failed	Floating Stairs (1:41:74)
11	Lorin Ball	Failed	Floating Stairs (1:45.18)
12	Jake Smith	Failed	Floating Stairs (1:53.83)
13	Caleb Graham	Failed	Floating Stairs (2:01.38)
14	Camilo Brokaw	Failed	Floating Stairs (2:39.19)
15	Joshua Grant	Failed	Floating Stairs (2:43.22)

=== Finals Leaderboard ===
Order #	Competitor	Outcome	Obstacle/Result
1	Drew Drechsel	Completed	2:29.93
2	Flip Rodriguez	Completed	2:31.00
3	Dan Galiczynski	Completed	3:10.90
4	Joe Moravsky	Completed	3:11.27
5	Brian Wilczewski	Completed	3:13.17
6	James McGrath	Completed	3:14.40
7	William Brown	Completed	3:17.50
8	Michael Silenzi	Completed	3:19.07
9	Paul Kasemir	Completed	3:19.50
10	Travis Rosen	Completed	3:20.67
11	Jeffery Tan	Completed	3:23.17
12	Tukrong Klengdong	Completed	3:26.73
13	Yev Kouchnir	Completed	3:30.00
14	Andrew Lowes	Completed	3:33.37
15	Dan Moschella	Completed	3:37.73
16	Jamie Rahn	Completed	3:44.47
17	Josh Cook	Completed	3:47.83
18	Dustin Rocho	Completed	3:48.50
19	David Slovenski	Completed	3:50.30
20	Brian Arnold	Completed	3:50.43
21	JB Douglas	Completed	3:52.10
22	Jason Soares	Completed	4:02.43
23	Isaac Caldiero	Completed	4:03.43
24	Ryan Stratis	Completed	4:04.90
25	Colby Frontiero	Completed	4:17.20
26	David Campbell	Completed	4:25.17
27	James Eggiman	Failed	Spider Climb (2:40.05)
28	James Sclar	Failed	Spider Climb (2:50.00)
29	Tim Shieff	Failed	Body Prop (1:58.50)
30	Casey Finley	Failed	Pole Grasper (2:00.57)
31	Michael Needham	Failed	Body Prop (2:15.67)
32	Tremayne Dortch	Failed	Pole Grasper (2:21.93)
33	Kyle Sinacori	Failed	Pole Grasper (2:25.17)
34	Travis Weinand	Failed	Body Prop (2:29.77)
35	Jesse La Flair	Failed	Cliffhanger (2:32.73)
36	Grant David	Failed	Rolling Steel (2:41.20)
37	Idoko Abuh	Failed	Rolling Steel (2:42.15)
38	Dan Mast	Failed	Cliffhanger (2:44.77)
39	Brian Kretsch	Failed	Cliffhanger (2:49.07)
40	Luke Carson	Failed	Cliffhanger (2:50.14)
41	Lance Pekus	Failed	Cliffhanger (2:51.23)
42	Andres De La Rosa	Failed	Pole Grasper (3:01.22)
43	Adam Grossman	Failed	Body Prop (3:24.54)
44	Michael Pericoloso	Failed	Body Prop (3:31.17)
45	Justin Walcker	Failed	Cliffhanger (3:46.06)
46	Seth Caskey	Failed	Body Prop (4:00.74)
47	Levi Keller	Failed	Rope Maze (1:34.47)
48	Chris Romrell	Failed	Floating Stairs (1:41.74)
49	Lorin Ball	Failed	Floating Stairs (1:45.18)
50	Jake Smith	Failed	Floating Stairs (1:53.83)
51	Caleb Garnham	Failed	Floating Stairs (2:01.38)
52	Mario Mendoza	Failed	Rope Maze (2:19.10)
53	Camilo Brokaw	Failed	Floating Stairs (2:39.19)
54	Joshua Grant	Failed	Floating Stairs (2:43.22)
55	Will Roberts	Failed	Rope Maze (3:21.13)
56	Brandon Smith	Failed	Salmon Ladder (1:21.00)
57	Jonathan Sharp Brown	Failed	Salmon Ladder (1:24.00)
58	Joseph Rosello	Failed	Salmon Ladder (1:33.70)
59	John Walker	Failed	Salmon Ladder (1:45.37)
60	Josh Romeo	Failed	Salmon Ladder (1:46.88)

== Notable achievements ==
No one defeated Stage 3, but Brian Arnold fell on the last obstacle, the Flying Bar, making him the farthest-going American on the Mount Midoriyama course since Kane Kosugi reached the final stage on SASUKE 8. He also made it farther than any competitor in American Ninja Warrior history, surpassing Brent Steffensen, who failed on the Hang Climb in Stage 3 the previous season, which remained a record until Geoff Britten and Isaac Caldiero both completed Stage 3 in Season 7.

=== Notable competitors ===
- Tennessee Titans safety Jordan Babineaux
- Personal trainer/former American Gladiator "Venom" Beth Horn
- World champion freerunner Tim "Livewire" Shieff
- Harlem Globetrotter Bull Bullard
- "Artix" (Adam Bohn) from the video game studio Artix Entertainment
- Olympic gold medalist runners Dee Dee Trotter and Lauryn Williams
- Olympic silver medalist heptathlon athlete Hyleas Fountain
- Olympic silver medalist gymnast Terin Humphrey
- Former professional snowboarder Graham Watanabe
- Professional MMA fighter Jason Soares
- Professional UFC MMA fighter and The Ultimate Fighter season 14 winner John Dodson
- Former NFL player Shawne Merriman

=== Women's success ===
This was the first season where women attempted the Warped Wall (obstacle #6) of a course. Nika Muckelroy made it to the Warped Wall in the Denver qualifying course. Jessie Graff fell in the Flying Nunchucks (obstacle #5) during Venice qualifying but advanced in 30th position and reached the Warped Wall of the Venice finals. Both were unable to get up the wall in the 3 attempts given.

== Mount Midoriyama ==
The competitor cleared that stage.
The competitor is female.
The competitor ran out of time on the obstacle.

=== Stage 1 ===
Stage 1 featured three new obstacles, the Timbers, the Giant Cycle, and the Rope Glider.

Order #	Competitor	Outcome	Obstacle/Result
1	Camilo Brokaw	Failed	3. Rope Glider
2	JB Douglas	Failed	4. Jumping Spider
3	Marc Namie (Wild Card)	Failed	4. Jumping Spider
4	Jason Soares	Failed	4. Jumping Spider
5	Erika Schwarz (Wild Card)	Failed	1. Timbers
6	Tukrong Klengdong	Failed	4. Jumping Spider
7	Adam Grossman	Failed	7. Spinning Bridge
8	Jamie Vanacore (Wild Card)	Failed	2. Giant Cycle
9	Dan Moschella	Failed	4. Jumping Spider
10	Travis Weinand	FINISH	2:07.70
11	Sean Bennett (Wild Card)	Failed	1. Timbers
12	Justin Walcker	Failed	4. Jumping Spider
13	Tremayne Dortch	Failed	4. Jumping Spider
14	Michelle Warnky (Wild Card)	Failed	2. Giant Cycle
15	Mike Bernardo (Wild Card)	Failed	5. Half Pipe Attack
16	Mike Maitem (Wild Card)	Failed	4. Jumping Spider (Digest.)
17	James Eggiman	Failed	4. Jumping Spider (Digest.)
18	Christopher Romrell	FINISH	1:45.14
19	Ryan Stratis	Failed	4. Jumping Spider
20	Colby Frontiero	Failed	4. Jumping Spider
21	Elet Hall (Wild Card)	FINISH	1:30.75
22	Leila Noone (Wild Card)	Failed	1. Timbers (Digest.)
23	Levi Keller	Failed	4. Jumping Spider (Digest.)
24	Brandon Smith	Failed	4. Jumping Spider (Digest.)
25	Lorin Ball	FINISH	1:31.38
26	Dustin Rocho	Failed	4. Jumping Spider
27	Dan Galiczynski	Failed	4. Jumping Spider
28	Kyle Sinacori	FINISH	2:02.40
29	Josh Cook	FINISH	1:43.97
30	David Campbell	Failed	8. Final Climb (Timed out.)
31	James McGrath	FINISH	1:31.53
32	Jeffrey Tan	Failed	4. Jumping Spider
33	Dan Mast	Failed	2. Giant Cycle
34	Joyce Shahboz (Wild Card)	Failed	4. Jumping Spider
35	Jonathan Brown	Failed	4. Jumping Spider (Digest.)
36	Will Roberts	Failed	4. Jumping Spider (Digest.)
37	Jake Smith	Failed	4. Jumping Spider (Digest.)
38	Joseph Rosello	Failed	5. Half-Pipe Attack
39	Idoko Abuh	FINISH	2:08.02
40	Nika Muckelroy (Wild Card)	Failed	2. Giant Cycle
41	Joe Moravsky	FINISH	1:33.77
42	James Sclar	Failed	4. Jumping Spider
43	Jamie Rahn	FINISH	1:50.74
44	David Slovenski	Failed	4. Jumping Spider (Digest.)
45	Tony Reddick (Wild Card)	Failed	4. Jumping Spider (Digest.)
46	Mia Lazerich (Wild Card)	Failed	2. Giant Cycle (Digest.)
47	Andrew Lowes	Failed	8. Final Climb (Timed out.)
48	Paul Kasemir	FINISH	1:47.66
49	Mario Mendoza	Failed	4. Jumping Spider
50	Michael Needham	Failed	2. Giant Cycle
51	Josh Romeo	Failed	7. Spinning Bridge
52	Michael Silenzi	Failed	4. Jumping Spider
53	Laura Kisana (Wild Card)	Failed	2. Giant Cycle
54	Dr. Noah Kaufman (Wild Card)	FINISH	1:55.90
55	Sam Sann (Wild Card)	Failed	2. Giant Cycle
56	Grant David	Failed	5. Half Pipe Attack
57	William Brown	FINISH	1:47.27
58	Josh Grant	Failed	4. Jumping Spider (Digest.)
59	Spencer Schnieder (Wild Card)	Failed	4. Jumping Spider (Digest.)
60	Kelvin Antoine (Wild Card)	Failed	4. Jumping Spider (Digest.)
61	Luke Carson	Failed	4. Jumping Spider (Digest.)
62	Isaac Caldiero	Failed	4. Jumping Spider
63	Casey Finley	FINISH	1:51.10
64	Lance Pekus	Failed	4. Jumping Spider
65	Jesse La Flair	FINISH	1:43.03
66	Andres De La Rosa	FINISH	2:05.76 (Digest.)
67	Thomas Hall (Wild Card)	Failed	6. Warped Wall (Timed out.) (Digest.)
68	Jessie Graff (Wild Card)	Failed	4. Jumping Spider
69	Brian Arnold	FINISH	2:06.36
70	Kacy Catanzaro (Wild Card)	Failed	2. Giant Cycle
71	Yev Kouchnir	FINISH	2:00.33
72	Brian Wilczewski	Failed	1. Timbers
73	Tim Shieff	Failed	4. Jumping Spider
74	Sean Morris (Wild Card)	Failed	5. Half Pipe Attack
75	Travis Rosen	FINISH	1:56.50
76	Drew Drechsel	FINISH	1:48.37
77	Flip Rodriguez	Failed	4. Jumping Spider
78	Brent Steffensen (Wild Card)	FINISH	1:39.64
79	Brian Kretsch	Failed	4. Jumping Spider (All cut.)
80	Michael Pericoloso	Failed	4. Jumping Spider (All cut.)
81	Seth Caskey	Failed	8. Final Climb (Timed out.) (All cut.)
82	John Walker	Failed	4. Jumping Spider (All cut.)
83	Caleb Garnham	Failed	4. Jumping Spider (All cut.)
84	Graham Watanabe (Wild Card)	Failed	6. Warped Wall (Timed out.) (All cut.)
85	Jason Williams (Wild Card)	Failed	4. Jumping Spider (All cut.)
86	Jonathan Morin (Wild Card)	Failed	5. Half Pipe Attack (All cut.)
87	Rashad Richardson (Wild Card)	Failed	4. Jumping Spider (All cut.)

=== Leaderboard ===
Order #	Competitor	Outcome	Obstacle/Result
1	Elet Hall	Completed	1:30.75
2	Lorin Ball	Completed	1:31.38
3	James McGrath	Completed	1:31.53
4	Joe Moravsky	Completed	1:33.53
5	Brent Steffensen	Completed	1:39.37
6	Jesse La Flair	Completed	1:43.03
7	Josh Cook	Completed	1:43.97
8	Chris Romrell	Completed	1:45.14
9	William Brown	Completed	1:47.27
10	Paul Kasemir	Completed	1:47.66
11	Drew Drechsel	Completed	1:48.37
12	Jamie Rahn	Completed	1:50.74
13	Casey Finley	Completed	1:51.10
14	Noah Kaufman	Completed	1:55.90
15	Travis Rosen	Completed	1:56.50
16	Yev Kouchnir	Completed	2:00.33
17	Kyle Sinacori	Completed	2:02.40
18	Andres De La Rosa	Completed	2:05.76
19	Brian Arnold	Completed	2:06.36
20	Travis Weinand	Completed	2:07.70
21	Idoko Abuh	Completed	2:08.02

=== Stage 2 ===
Stage 2 featured one new obstacle, the Hang Slider.

Order #	Finalist	Result	Notes
1	Christopher Romrell	3. Unstable Bridge	Transition to second plank.
2	Jesse La Flair	2. Double Salmon Ladder	Bar derailed before transitioning to second side.
3	Jamie Rahn	2. Double Salmon Ladder	Got to the second ladder in a crooked position, and shortly the bar diverged from the rungs.
4	Joe Moravsky	FINISH (1:47.30)	
5	Travis Weinand	FINISH (1:54.87)	
6	Paul Kasemir	2. Double Salmon Ladder	Seventh level.
7	Kyle Sinacori	2. Double Salmon Ladder	Digest. Transition to the second/third rung.
8	Yev Kouchnir	2. Double Salmon Ladder	Digest. Transition to the top rung.
9	William Brown	2. Double Salmon Ladder	Digest. Transition to the top rung.
10	Elet Hall (Wild Card)	2. Double Salmon Ladder	Digest. Bar derailed before transitioning to second side.
11	Lorin Ball	3. Unstable Bridge	Digest. Transition to second plank.
12	Josh Cook	2. Double Salmon Ladder	Transition to the second rung.
13	Idoko Abuh	FINISH (1:36.30)	
14	Casey Finley	FINISH (1:23.64)	Digest.
15	James McGrath	FINISH (1:29.34)	Digest.
16	Andres De La Rosa	5. Metal Spin	Slid down chain, Feet hit the water.
17	Drew Drechsel	3. Unstable Bridge	Transition to second plank.
18	Travis Rosen	FINISH (1:59.83)	
19	Dr. Noah Kaufman (Wild Card)	2. Double Salmon Ladder	Transition to second plank.
20	Brian Arnold	FINISH (1:38.77)	
21	Brent Steffensen (Wild Card)	2. Double Salmon Ladder	Transition to the seventh rung.

=== Leaderboard ===
Order #	Finalist	Result	Notes
1	Casey Finley	Completed	1:23.64
2	James McGrath	Completed	1:29.34
3	Idoko Abuh	Completed	1:36.30
4	Brian Arnold	Completed	1:38.77
5	Joe Moravsky	Completed	1:47.30
6	Travis Weinand	Completed	1:54.87
7	Travis Rosen	Completed	1:59.83

=== Stage 3 ===
Order #	Finalist	Result	Notes
1	Travis Rosen	3. Floating Boards	Transition to the second board.
2	Travis Weinand	2. Doorknob Grasper	Transition to the third doorknob.
3	James 'The Beast' McGrath	3. Floating Boards	Transition to the second board.
4	Idoko Abuh	1. Roulette Cylinder	Lost grip at the end of the track.
5	Casey Finley	1. Roulette Cylinder	Transition to the Doorknob Grasper.
6	Joe Moravsky	3. Floating Boards	Transition to the fourth board.
7	Brian Arnold	8. Flying Bar	Fell at the fourth cradle. Last Man Standing.

== Ratings ==
Network	Episode		Air date	Timeslot	Rating/Share (18–49)		Viewers (millions)	Ref.
G4	1	"Venice Beach Qualifying Part 1"	June 30, 2013	Sunday 9:00 p.m.	0.1	N/A	0.306	
NBC	2	"Venice Beach Qualifying Part 2"	July 1, 2013	Monday 8:00 p.m.	1.7	5	5.040	
G4	3	"Baltimore Qualifying Part 1"	July 7, 2013	Sunday 9:00 p.m.	0.1	N/A	0.216	
NBC	4	"Baltimore Qualifying Part 2"	July 8, 2013	Monday 8:00 p.m.	1.6	5	5.070	
G4	5	"Miami Qualifying Part 1"	July 14, 2013	Sunday 9:00 p.m.	0.1	N/A	0.258	
NBC	6	"Miami Qualifying Part 2"	July 15, 2013	Monday 8:00 p.m.	1.6	5	5.220	
G4	7	"Denver Qualifying Part 1"	July 21, 2013	Sunday 9:00 p.m.	0.1	N/A	0.263	
NBC	8	"Denver Qualifying Part 2"	July 22, 2013	Monday 8:00 p.m.	1.6	5	5.260	
G4	9	"Venice Beach Finals Part 1"	July 28, 2013	Sunday 9:00 p.m.	0.2	N/A	0.308	
NBC	10	"Venice Beach Finals Part 2"	July 29, 2013	Monday 8:00 p.m.	1.5	5	5.110	
G4	11	"Baltimore Finals Part 1"	August 4, 2013	Sunday 9:00 p.m.	0.1	N/A	0.189	
NBC	12	"Baltimore Finals Part 2"	August 5, 2013	Monday 8:00 p.m.	1.4	4	4.990	
G4	13	"Miami Finals Part 1"	August 11, 2013	Sunday 9:00 p.m.	0.1	N/A	0.343	
NBC	14	"Miami Finals Part 2"	August 12, 2013	Monday 8:00 p.m.	1.6	5	5.100	
G4	15	"Denver Finals Part 1"	August 18, 2013	Sunday 9:00 p.m.	0.1	N/A	0.288	
NBC	16	"Denver Finals Part 2"	August 19, 2013	Monday 8:00 p.m.	1.5	5	4.900	
G4	17	"Las Vegas Finals Parts 1–4"	August 25, 2013	Sunday 9:00 p.m.	0.1	N/A	0.364	
NBC	18	"Las Vegas Finals Part 2"	August 26, 2013	Monday 8:00 p.m.	1.7	5	5.810	
NBC	19	"Las Vegas Finals Part 3–4"	September 2, 2013	Monday 8:00 p.m.	1.8	5	5.490	
NBC	20	"Las Vegas Finals Part 4"	September 9, 2013	Monday 9:00 p.m.	1.7	5	5.340	
NBC	21	"Las Vegas Finals Part 5"	September 16, 2013	Monday 9:00 p.m.	1.5	4	4.040	
