= American Ninja Warrior season 4 =

Season of American reality/sport competition television series American Ninja Warrior

American Ninja Warrior
- Season 4
- Hosted by: Matt Iseman; Jonny Moseley; Angela Sun
- Finals venue: Las Vegas, NV
- No. of episodes: 24

Release
- Original network: NBC; G4
- Original release: May 20 – July 23, 2012

Season chronology
- ← Previous; Season 3 Next → Season 5

The fourth season of American Ninja Warrior began on May 20, 2012, and aired on NBC and G4. This was a landmark season for Ninja Warrior, as the entire format was overhauled. For the first time, the finals took place on U.S. soil. In addition, regional qualifying and finals were added, taking place in the series' flagship location, Venice Beach, CA, Dallas, TX, and Miami, FL. New co-host Jonny Moseley replaced Jimmy Smith, while Angela Sun replaced Alison Haislip. Again, the winner would have received $500,000 and the coveted American Ninja Warrior title. Brent Steffensen became the first competitor to complete the Ultimate Cliffhanger.

== Changes ==
Mount Midoriyama was moved from Japan to Las Vegas, Nevada for the national finals.

== Regions ==
Instead of just one region, there were six regions: the Southwest, the Midwest, the Northeast, the Northwest, the Midsouth, and the Southeast.

== Obstacles ==
=== Regional Qualifying & Finals ===
Event		Obstacles										Finishers
Southwest	Qualifying	Quad Steps	Log Grip	Spinning Log	Jump Hang	Devil Steps	Warped Wall	N/A				26
Southwest	Finals	Quad Steps	Log Grip	Spinning Log	Jump Hang	Devil Steps	Warped Wall	Salmon Ladder		Arm Rings	Cargo Climb	13
Midwest	Qualifying	Quad Steps	Log Grip	Bridge of Blades	Jump Hang	Curtain Slider	Warped Wall	N/A				12
Midwest	Finals	Quad Steps	Log Grip	Bridge of Blades	Jump Hang	Curtain Slider	Warped Wall	Salmon Ladder		Lamp Grasper	Cargo Climb	8
Northeast	Qualifying	Quad Steps	Log Grip	Bungee Bridge	Jump Hang	Jumping Bars	Wall Lift	Warped Wall	N/A			19
Northeast	Finals	Quad Steps	Log Grip	Bungee Bridge	Jump Hang	Jumping Bars	Wall Lift	Warped Wall	Salmon Ladder	Cycle Road	Cargo Climb	8
Northwest	Qualifying	Quad Steps	Log Grip	Spinning Log	Jump Hang	Pipe Slider	Warped Wall	N/A				27
Northwest	Finals	Quad Steps	Log Grip	Spinning Log	Jump Hang	Devil Steps	Warped Wall	Salmon Ladder		Arm Rings	Cargo Climb	16
Midsouth	Qualifying	Quad Steps	Log Grip	Bridge of Blades	Jump Hang	Rope Junction	Warped Wall	N/A				22
Midsouth	Finals	Quad Steps	Log Grip	Bridge of Blades	Jump Hang	Rope Junction	Warped Wall	Salmon Ladder		Lamp Grasper	Cargo Climb	14
Southeast	Qualifying	Quad Steps	Log Grip	Bungee Bridge	Jump Hang	Swing Circle	Wall Lift	Warped Wall	N/A			21
Southeast	Finals	Quad Steps	Log Grip	Bungee Bridge	Jump Hang	Swing Circle	Wall Lift	Warped Wall	Salmon Ladder	Cycle Road	Cargo Climb	18

=== National Finals ===
Event	Obstacle(s)								Finishers
Stage 1	Step Slider	Rolling Log	Giant Swing	Jumping Spider	Half Pipe Attack	Warped Wall	Spinning Bridge	Final Climb	24
Stage 2	Slider Drop	Double Salmon Ladder	Unstable Bridge	Balance Tank	Metal Spin	Wall Lift			1
Stage 3	Roulette Cylinder	Doorknob Grasper	Floating Boards	Ultimate Cliffhanger	Bungee Rope Climb	Hang Climb	Spider Flip	Flying Bar	0
Stage 4	Rope Climb								N/A

== Regional Qualifying ==
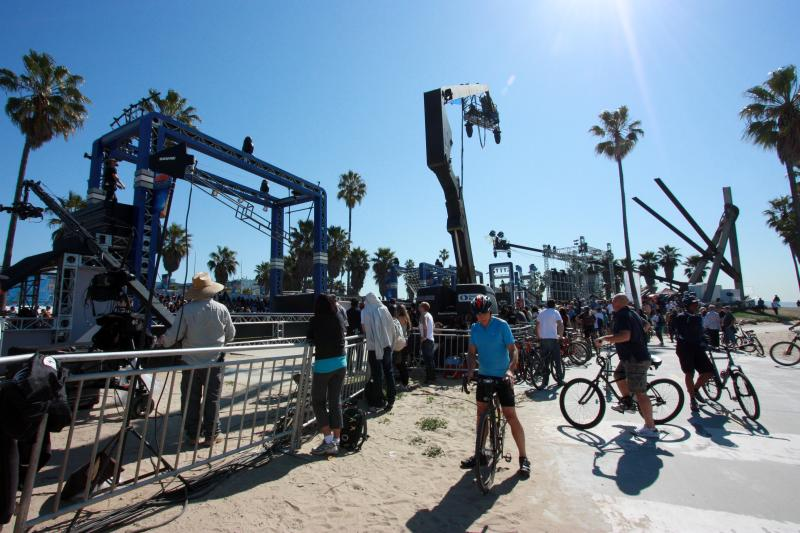
The Venice Beach regional qualifying course during season 4

Submission videos for American Ninja Warrior Season 4 had been collected since January 25, 2012. There were six regional competitions held in three locations: Venice Beach, CA (Southwest and Northwest), Dallas, TX (Midwest and Midsouth), and Miami, FL (Northeast and Southeast) that determined the 100 competitors to participate in the qualifying rounds. The top 30 competitors that went the farthest the fastest would move on to the finals rounds.

=== Southwest Regional Qualifying ===
Order #	Competitor	Outcome	Obstacle/Result
1	Brent Steffensen	Completed	0:50.10
2	Dan Mast	Completed	0:53.65
3	Remi Bakkar	Completed	0:54.10
4	Jesse La Flair	Completed	0:54.15
5	Shane Daniels	Completed	0:54.58
6	Paul Darnell	Completed	1:01.01
7	Michael "Frosti" Zernow	Completed	1:01.52
8	Derek Nakamoto	Completed	1:04.46
9	Dorian Cedars	Completed	1:05.95
10	Rick Pitcher	Completed	1:06.28
11	Daron Payne	Completed	1:11.94
12	Ronnie Shalvis Jr.	Completed	1:12.54
13	Ryan Thompson	Completed	1:13.97
14	Dustin Rocho	Completed	1:16.44
15	Vincent Gorby	Completed	1:17.50
16	Ryan Cousins	Completed	1:18.88
17	Joseph "Jo" Paloma	Completed	1:20.54
18	Kole Stevens	Completed	1:22.27
19	Chad Simpson	Completed	1:23.73
20	Evan Dollard	Completed	1:28.00
21	Will Roberts	Completed	1:32.05
22	Dylan Curry	Completed	1:43.56
23	Seddrick Bassett	Completed	1:47.76
24	Victor Rivera	Completed	1:51.15
25	Kody Klein	Completed	1:59.89
26	Kelvin Antoine	Completed	2:29.97
27	Caine Sinclair	Failed	Warped Wall (0:44.40)
28	Matthew Conway	Failed	Warped Wall (0:45.78)
29	Travis Brewer	Failed	Warped Wall (0:48.94)
30	David Money	Failed	Warped Wall (0:49.53)

=== Midwest Regional Qualifying ===
Order #	Competitor	Outcome	Obstacle/Result
1	Andrew Karsen	Completed	1:00.91
2	Matthew Derouen	Completed	1:11.94
3	Joshua Grant	Completed	1:12.30
4	Stephen Volcko	Completed	1:18.86
5	Zach Sokoloski	Completed	1:28.28
6	Andrew Lowes	Completed	1:43.97
7	Nick Kostner	Completed	1:48.48
8	Kevin Arehart	Completed	2:01.27
9	Cade Halada	Completed	2:01.46
10	Adam Kezele	Completed	2:07.50
11	James Hardin	Completed	2:16.86
12	Johnathan Morin	Completed	2:27.39
13	Jack Morgan	Failed	Warped Wall (0:35.76)
14	Eric Davies	Failed	Warped Wall (0:45.73)
15	James Jacoy	Failed	Warped Wall (0:50.23)
16	Brent Haddock	Failed	Warped Wall (0:50.82)
17	Darrel Robertson	Failed	Warped Wall (0:53.57)
18	Eric Sietsema	Failed	Warped Wall (0:54.50)
19	Will Dodd	Failed	Warped Wall (0:54.85)
20	Scott Robinson	Failed	Warped Wall (0:55.30)
21	Arthur Skov	Failed	Warped Wall (0:56.17)
22	Phillip Michou	Failed	Warped Wall (0:57.19)
23	Michael Silenzi	Failed	Warped Wall (0:57.39)
24	David Seitz	Failed	Warped Wall (0:58.04)
25	George Murphy	Failed	Warped Wall (1:02.25)
26	Nickolas "Nick Lovin" Stephforn	Failed	Warped Wall (1:04.91)
27	Nate Aye	Failed	Warped Wall (1:04.94)
28	Joshua Tate	Failed	Warped Wall (1:05.51)
29	Matt Laessig	Failed	Warped Wall (1:05.84)
30	Justin West	Failed	Warped Wall (1:06.00)

=== Northeast Regional Qualifying ===
Order #	Competitor	Outcome	Obstacle/Result
1	Tim Shieff	Completed	1:07.37
2	Michael Needham	Completed	1:20.52
3	Chris Wilczewski	Completed	1:20.70
4	Elet Hall	Completed	1:33.08
5	Phillip Pirollo	Completed	1:35.24
6	Jesse Villarreal	Completed	1:36.04
7	Danny Johnson	Completed	1:38.60
8	Yosuel Garcia	Completed	1:41.21
9	Travis Graves	Completed	1:42.04
10	Luis Moco	Completed	1:47.38
11	Jamie Rahn	Completed	1:52.62
12	Gabe Arnold	Completed	2:01.00
13	Ryan Stevens	Completed	2:01.24
14	Mike Bernardo	Completed	2:04.75
15	John Strzepek	Completed	2:06.09
16	Christopher DiGangi	Completed	2:41.91
17	Travis Weinand	Completed	2:51.83
18	Andrew Wood	Completed	2:52.77
19	Adam Kosak	Completed	2:55.88
20	Khalil Uqdah	Failed	Warped Wall (1:00.91)
21	Dan Galiczynski	Failed	Warped Wall (1:01.67)
22	John Sapinoso	Failed	Warped Wall (1:03.93)
23	Jeremy Allen	Failed	Warped Wall (1:15.80)
24	Bryant Edwards	Failed	Warped Wall (1:20.76)
25	Michael Pericoloso	Failed	Warped Wall (1:22.28)
26	Shaun Antonio	Failed	Warped Wall (1:30.76)
27	Chris Swartz	Failed	Warped Wall (1:32.47)
28	Matt Mings	Failed	Warped Wall (1:35.16)
29	Bradley Smith Jr.	Failed	Warped Wall (1:37.71)
30	Brad Martin	Failed	Warped Wall (1:42.54)

=== Northwest Regional Qualifying ===
Order #	Competitor	Outcome	Obstacle/Result
1	David Campbell	Completed	0:58.55
2	James McGrath	Completed	1:01.87
3	Travis Furlanic	Completed	1:08.37
4	Justin Sweeney	Completed	1:16.51
5	James Sclar	Completed	1:16.91
6	Glenn Black	Completed	1:23.92
7	Nathan Sausedo	Completed	1:24.91
8	Josh Horsley	Completed	1:25.41
9	Justin Walcker	Completed	1:25.64
10	Brian Kretsch	Completed	1:26.37
11	Gunner Bahn	Completed	1:27.28
12	Kevan Reoli	Completed	1:31.41
13	Nicholas Frank	Completed	1:34.70
14	J.B. Douglas	Completed	1:41.61
15	Kyle Cochran	Completed	1:42.64
16	Patrick McGrath	Completed	1:51.84
17	Ben Musholt	Completed	1:55.12
18	Brian Unger	Completed	1:56.46
19	Angelo Dela Cruz	Completed	2:05.40
20	Marcus Ramos	Completed	2:15.33
21	Michael Wenger	Completed	2:20.02
22	Andres De La Rosa	Completed	2:20.05
23	Chris Miller	Completed	2:22.17
24	Carlos Solis	Completed	2:42.00
25	Drew Howard	Completed	3:06.15
26	Richie Wight	Completed	3:06.75
27	Tom Hutchman	Completed	3:07.54
28	Sean Noble	Failed	Warped Wall (0:53.69)
29	Ben Snead	Failed	Warped Wall (0:57.36)
30	Joseph Duncan	Failed	Warped Wall (1:02.10)
31	Michael Lee	Failed	Warped Wall (1:02.19)

=== Midsouth Regional Qualifying ===
Order #	Competitor	Outcome	Obstacle/Result
1	Paul Kasemir	Completed	0:53.99
2	Jake Smith	Completed	0:54.32
3	Brandon Douglass	Completed	0:59.41
4	Sat Khalsa	Completed	1:02.91
5	Lorin Ball	Completed	1:05.60
6	Josh Lobeck	Completed	1:07.50
7	Luke Cash	Completed	1:11.30
8	Joe Lobeck	Completed	1:12.36
9	George Dunwoody	Completed	1:14.55
10	Jereme Sanders	Completed	1:18.60
11	Alan Connealy	Completed	1:20.06
12	Ahmed Toure	Completed	1:20.37
13	Stephen Solt	Completed	1:24.06
14	Brian Arnold	Completed	1:30.56
15	Arnold Risvek	Completed	1:32.74
16	James Wyatt	Completed	1:40.44
17	Kevin Klein	Completed	1:40.82
18	Todd Stair	Completed	1:46.04
19	Josh Kronberg	Completed	1:58.87
20	Bob Pondrom	Completed	2:05.86
21	Miguel Gonzalez	Completed	2:08.73
22	Tremayne Dortch	Completed	2:15.14
23	Jaret Salas	Failed	Warped Wall (0:43.68)
24	Angel Flores	Failed	Warped Wall (0:44.81)
25	David Cabrera	Failed	Warped Wall (0:49.63)
26	Nathaniel Spencer	Failed	Warped Wall (0:50.46)
27	Justin D'Avila	Failed	Warped Wall (0:51.12)
28	Michael Cusic	Failed	Warped Wall (0:51.63)
29	Justin Dickstein	Failed	Warped Wall (0:53.43)
30	Erick Eischen	Failed	Warped Wall (0:54.88)

=== Southeast Regional Qualifying ===
Order #	Competitor	Outcome	Obstacle/Result
1	David "Flip" Rodriguez	Completed	0:57.34
2	Drew Drechsel	Completed	1:02.24
3	Sean Morris	Completed	1:09.79
4	Travis Rosen	Completed	1:16.26
5	Ben Wicks	Completed	1:18.57
6	Thomas Hall	Completed	1:24.45
7	Bull Bullard	Completed	1:27.55
8	William Brown	Completed	1:28.92
9	Kamerion Wimbley	Completed	1:30.87
10	Tony Reddick	Completed	1:31.16
11	Brendan Kelly	Completed	1:33.11
12	Toshio Sidney-Ando	Completed	1:34.58
13	Colton Sansum	Completed	1:36.00
14	Gabriel Cortes	Completed	1:36.36
15	Andy Taylor	Completed	1:42.75
16	Dante Mucherino	Completed	1:46.22
17	Michael Eckert	Completed	1:47.36
18	Adam Grossman	Completed	1:49.08
19	Logan Cruz	Completed	1:51.41
20	Adam Hughes	Completed	1:56.69
21	Kyle Stokes	Completed	2:16.33
22	Jared "J.J." Woods	Failed	Warped Wall (0:51.58)
23	Amos Rendao	Failed	Warped Wall (0:54.36)
24	Niko Bogucki	Failed	Warped Wall (0:58.05)
25	Timothy Oliphant	Failed	Warped Wall (1:04.82)
26	Paul O'Connor	Failed	Warped Wall (1:08.86)
27	Patrick Cusic	Failed	Warped Wall (1:08.94)
28	Arthur Hinton	Failed	Warped Wall (1:10.33)
29	Ryan Saegert	Failed	Warped Wall (1:11.59)
30	Jacob Siler	Failed	Warped Wall (1:13.78)

=== Venice Beach Qualifying Leaderboard ===
Order #	Competitor	Outcome	Obstacle/Result
1	Brent Steffensen	Completed	0:50.10
2	Dan Mast	Completed	0:53.65
3	Remi Bakkar	Completed	0:54.10
4	Jesse La Flair	Completed	0:54.15
5	Shane Daniels	Completed	0:54.58
6	David Campbell	Completed	0:58.55
7	Paul Darnell	Completed	1:01.01
8	Michael "Frosti" Zernow	Completed	1:01.52
9	James McGrath	Completed	1:01.87
10	Derek Nakamoto	Completed	1:04.46
11	Dorian Cedars	Completed	1:05.95
12	Rick Pitcher	Completed	1:06.28
13	Travis Furlanic	Completed	1:08.37
14	Daron Payne	Completed	1:11.94
15	Ronnie Shalvis Jr.	Completed	1:12.54
16	Ryan Thompson	Completed	1:13.97
17	Dustin Rocho	Completed	1:16.44
18	Justin Sweeney	Completed	1:16.51
19	James Sclar	Completed	1:16.91
20	Vincent Gorby	Completed	1:17.50
21	Ryan Cousins	Completed	1:18.88
22	Joseph "Jo" Paloma	Completed	1:20.54
23	Kole Stevens	Completed	1:22.27
24	Chad Simpson	Completed	1:23.73
25	Glenn Black	Completed	1:23.92
26	Nathan Sausedo	Completed	1:24.91
27	Josh Horsley	Completed	1:25.41
28	Justin Walcker	Completed	1:25.64
29	Brian Kretsch	Completed	1:26.37
30	Gunner Bahn	Completed	1:27.28
31	Evan Dollard	Completed	1:28.00
32	Kevan Reoli	Completed	1:31.41
33	Will Roberts	Completed	1:32.05
34	Nicholas Frank	Completed	1:34.70
35	J.B. Douglas	Completed	1:41.61
36	Kyle Cochran	Completed	1:42.64
37	Dylan Curry	Completed	1:43.56
38	Seddrick Bassett	Completed	1:47.76
39	Victor Rivera	Completed	1:51.15
40	Patrick McGrath	Completed	1:51.84
41	Ben Musholt	Completed	1:55.12
42	Brian Unger	Completed	1:56.46
43	Kody Klein	Completed	1:59.89
44	Angelo Dela Cruz	Completed	2:05.40
45	Marcus Ramos	Completed	2:15.33
46	Michael Wenger	Completed	2:20.02
47	Andres De La Rosa	Completed	2:20.05
48	Chris Miller	Completed	2:22.17
49	Kelvin Antoine	Completed	2:29.97
50	Carlos Solis	Completed	2:42.00
51	Drew Howard	Completed	3:06.15
52	Richie Wight	Completed	3:06.75
53	Tom Hutchman	Completed	3:07.54
54	Caine Sinclair	Failed	Warped Wall (0:44.40)
55	Matthew Conway	Failed	Warped Wall (0:45.78)
56	Travis Brewer	Failed	Warped Wall (0:48.94)
57	David Money	Failed	Warped Wall (0:49.53)
58	Sean Noble	Failed	Warped Wall (0:53.69)
59	Ben Snead	Failed	Warped Wall (0:57.36)
60	Joseph Duncan	Failed	Warped Wall (1:02.10)
61	Michael Lee	Failed	Warped Wall (1:02.19)

=== Dallas Qualifying Leaderboard ===
Order #	Competitor	Outcome	Obstacle/Result
1	Paul Kasemir	Completed	0:53.99
2	Jake Smith	Completed	0:54.32
3	Brandon Douglass	Completed	0:59.41
4	Andrew Karsen	Completed	1:00.91
5	Sat Khalsa	Completed	1:02.91
6	Lorin Ball	Completed	1:05.60
7	Josh Lobeck	Completed	1:07.50
8	Luke Cash	Completed	1:11.30
9	Matthew Derouen	Completed	1:11.94
10	Joshua Grant	Completed	1:12.30
11	Joe Lobeck	Completed	1:12.36
12	George Dunwoody	Completed	1:14.55
13	Jereme Sanders	Completed	1:18.60
14	Stephen Volcko	Completed	1:18.86
15	Alan Connealy	Completed	1:20.06
16	Ahmed Toure	Completed	1:20.37
17	Stephen Solt	Completed	1:24.06
18	Zach Sokoloski	Completed	1:28.28
19	Brian Arnold	Completed	1:30.56
20	Arnold Risvek	Completed	1:32.74
21	James Wyatt	Completed	1:40.44
22	Kevin Klein	Completed	1:40.82
23	Andrew Lowes	Completed	1:43.97
24	Todd Stair	Completed	1:46.04
25	Nick Kostner	Completed	1:48.48
26	Josh Kronberg	Completed	1:58.87
27	Kevin Arehart	Completed	2:01.27
28	Cade Halada	Completed	2:01.46
29	Bob Pondrom	Completed	2:05.86
30	Adam Kezele	Completed	2:07.50
31	Miguel Gonzalez	Completed	2:08.73
32	Tremayne Dortch	Completed	2:15.14
33	James Hardin	Completed	2:16.86
34	Johnathan Morin	Completed	2:27.39
35	Jack Morgan	Failed	Warped Wall (0:35.76)
36	Jaret Salas	Failed	Warped Wall (0:43.68)
37	Angel Flores	Failed	Warped Wall (0:44.81)
38	Eric Davies	Failed	Warped Wall (0:45.73)
39	David Cabrera	Failed	Warped Wall (0:49.63)
40	James Jacoy	Failed	Warped Wall (0:50.23)
41	Nathaniel Spencer	Failed	Warped Wall (0:50.46)
42	Brent Haddock	Failed	Warped Wall (0:50.82)
43	Justin D'Avila	Failed	Warped Wall (0:51.12)
44	Michael Cusic	Failed	Warped Wall (0:51.63)
45	Justin Dickstein	Failed	Warped Wall (0:53.43)
46	Darrel Robertson	Failed	Warped Wall (0:53.57)
47	Eric Sietsema	Failed	Warped Wall (0:54.50)
48	Will Dodd	Failed	Warped Wall (0:54.85)
49	Erick Eischen	Failed	Warped Wall (0:54.88)
50	Scott Robinson	Failed	Warped Wall (0:55.30)
51	Arthur Skov	Failed	Warped Wall (0:56.17)
52	Phillip Michou	Failed	Warped Wall (0:57.19)
53	Michael Silenzi	Failed	Warped Wall (0:57.39)
54	David Seitz	Failed	Warped Wall (0:58.04)
55	George Murphy	Failed	Warped Wall (1:02.25)
56	Nickolas "Nick Lovin" Stephforn	Failed	Warped Wall (1:04.91)
57	Nate Aye	Failed	Warped Wall (1:04.94)
58	Joshua Tate	Failed	Warped Wall (1:05.51)
59	Matt Laessig	Failed	Warped Wall (1:05.84)
60	Justin West	Failed	Warped Wall (1:06.00)

=== Miami Qualifying Leaderboard ===
Order #	Competitor	Outcome	Obstacle/Result
1	David "Flip" Rodriguez	Completed	0:57.34
2	Drew Drechsel	Completed	1:02.24
3	Tim Shieff	Completed	1:07.37
4	Sean Morris	Completed	1:09.79
5	Travis Rosen	Completed	1:16.26
6	Ben Wicks	Completed	1:18.57
7	Michael Needham	Completed	1:20.52
8	Chris Wilczewski	Completed	1:20.70
9	Thomas Hall	Completed	1:24.45
10	Bull Bullard	Completed	1:27.55
11	William Brown	Completed	1:28.92
12	Kamerion Wimbley	Completed	1:30.87
13	Tony Reddick	Completed	1:31.16
14	Elet Hall	Completed	1:33.08
15	Brendan Kelly	Completed	1:33.11
16	Toshio Sidney-Ando	Completed	1:34.58
17	Phillip Pirollo	Completed	1:35.24
18	Colton Sansum	Completed	1:36.00
19	Jesse Villarreal	Completed	1:36.04
20	Gabriel Cortes	Completed	1:36.36
21	Danny Johnson	Completed	1:38.60
22	Yosuel Garcia	Completed	1:41.21
23	Travis Graves	Completed	1:42.04
24	Andy Taylor	Completed	1:42.75
25	Dante Mucherino	Completed	1:46.22
26	Michael Eckert	Completed	1:47.36
27	Luis Moco	Completed	1:47.38
28	Adam Grossman	Completed	1:49.08
29	Logan Cruz	Completed	1:51.41
30	Jamie Rahn	Completed	1:52.62
31	Adam Hughes	Completed	1:56.39
32	Gabe Arnold	Completed	2:01.00
33	Ryan Stevens	Completed	2:01.24
34	Mike Bernardo	Completed	2:04.75
35	John Strzepek	Completed	2:06.09
36	Kyle Stokes	Completed	2:16.33
37	Christopher DiGangi	Completed	2:41.91
38	Travis Weinand	Completed	2:51.83
39	Andrew Wood	Completed	2:52.77
40	Adam Kosak	Completed	2:55.88
41	Jared "J.J." Woods	Failed	Warped Wall (0:51.58)
42	Amos Rendao	Failed	Warped Wall (0:54.36)
43	Niko Bogucki	Failed	Warped Wall (0:58.05)
44	Khalil Uqdah	Failed	Warped Wall (1:00.91)
45	Dan Galiczynski	Failed	Warped Wall (1:01.67)
46	John Sapinoso	Failed	Warped Wall (1:03.93)
47	Timothy Oliphant	Failed	Warped Wall (1:04.82)
48	Paul O'Connor	Failed	Warped Wall (1:08.86)
49	Patrick Cusic	Failed	Warped Wall (1:08.94)
50	Arthur Hinton	Failed	Warped Wall (1:10.33)
51	Ryan Saegert	Failed	Warped Wall (1:11.59)
52	Jacob Siler	Failed	Warped Wall (1:13.78)
53	Jeremy Allen	Failed	Warped Wall (1:15.80)
54	Bryant Edwards	Failed	Warped Wall (1:20.76)
55	Michael Pericoloso	Failed	Warped Wall (1:22.28)
56	Shaun Antonio	Failed	Warped Wall (1:30.76)
57	Chris Swartz	Failed	Warped Wall (1:32.47)
58	Matt Mings	Failed	Warped Wall (1:35.16)
59	Bradley Smith Jr.	Failed	Warped Wall (1:37.71)
60	Brad Martin	Failed	Warped Wall (1:42.54)

=== Regional Qualifying Leaderboard ===
Order #	Competitor	Outcome	Obstacle/Result
1	Brent Steffensen	Completed	0:50.10
2	Dan Mast	Completed	0:53.65
3	Paul Kasemir	Completed	0:53.99
4	Remi Bakkar	Completed	0:54.10
5	Jesse La Flair	Completed	0:54.15
6	Jake Smith	Completed	0:54.32
7	Shane Daniels	Completed	0:54.58
8	David "Flip" Rodriguez	Completed	0:57.34
9	David Campbell	Completed	0:58.55
10	Brandon Douglass	Completed	0:59.41
11	Andrew Karsen	Completed	1:00.91
12	Paul Darnell	Completed	1:01.01
13	Michael "Frosti" Zernow	Completed	1:01.52
14	James McGrath	Completed	1:01.87
15	Drew Drechsel	Completed	1:02.24
16	Sat Khalsa	Completed	1:02.91
17	Derek Nakamoto	Completed	1:04.46
18	Lorin Ball	Completed	1:05.60
19	Dorian Cedars	Completed	1:05.95
20	Rick Pitcher	Completed	1:06.28
21	Tim Shieff	Completed	1:07.37
22	Josh Lobeck	Completed	1:07.50
23	Travis Furlanic	Completed	1:08.37
24	Sean Morris	Completed	1:09.79
25	Luke Cash	Completed	1:11.30
26	Daron Payne	Completed	1:11.94
27	Matthew Derouen	Completed	1:11.94
28	Joshua Grant	Completed	1:12.30
29	Joe Lobeck	Completed	1:12.36
30	Ronnie Shalvis Jr.	Completed	1:12.54
31	Ryan Thompson	Completed	1:13.97
32	George Dunwoody	Completed	1:14.55
33	Travis Rosen	Completed	1:16.26
34	Dustin Rocho	Completed	1:16.44
35	Justin Sweeney	Completed	1:16.51
36	James Sclar	Completed	1:16.91
37	Vincent Gorby	Completed	1:17.50
38	Ben Wicks	Completed	1:18.57
39	Jereme Sanders	Completed	1:18.60
40	Stephen Volcko	Completed	1:18.86
41	Ryan Cousins	Completed	1:18.88
42	Alan Connealy	Completed	1:20.06
43	Ahmed Toure	Completed	1:20.37
44	Michael Needham	Completed	1:20.52
45	Joseph "Jo" Paloma	Completed	1:20.54
46	Chris Wilczewski	Completed	1:20.70
47	Kole Stevens	Completed	1:22.27
48	Chad Simpson	Completed	1:23.73
49	Glenn Black	Completed	1:23.92
50	Stephen Solt	Completed	1:24.06
51	Thomas Hall	Completed	1:24.45
52	Nathan Sausedo	Completed	1:24.91
53	Josh Horsley	Completed	1:25.41
54	Justin Walcker	Completed	1:25.64
55	Brian Kretsch	Completed	1:26.37
56	Gunner Bahn	Completed	1:27.28
57	Bull Bullard	Completed	1:27.55
58	Evan Dollard	Completed	1:28.00
59	Zach Sokoloski	Completed	1:28.28
60	William Brown	Completed	1:28.92
61	Brian Arnold	Completed	1:30.56
62	Kamerion Wimbley	Completed	1:30.87
63	Tony Reddick	Completed	1:31.16
64	Kevan Reoli	Completed	1:31.41
65	Will Roberts	Completed	1:32.05
66	Arnold Risvek	Completed	1:32.74
67	Elet Hall	Completed	1:33.08
68	Brendan Kelly	Completed	1:33.11
69	Toshio Sidney-Ando	Completed	1:34.58
70	Nicholas Frank	Completed	1:34.70
71	Phillip Pirollo	Completed	1:35.24
72	Colton Sansum	Completed	1:36.00
73	Jesse Villarreal	Completed	1:36.04
74	Gabriel Cortes	Completed	1:36.36
75	Danny Johnson	Completed	1:38.60
76	James Wyatt	Completed	1:40.44
77	Kevin Klein	Completed	1:40.82
78	Yosuel Garcia	Completed	1:41.21
79	J.B. Douglas	Completed	1:41.61
80	Travis Graves	Completed	1:42.04
81	Kyle Cochran	Completed	1:42.64
82	Andy Taylor	Completed	1:42.75
83	Dylan Curry	Completed	1:43.56
84	Andrew Lowes	Completed	1:43.97
85	Todd Stair	Completed	1:46.04
86	Dante Mucherino	Completed	1:46.22
87	Michael Eckert	Completed	1:47.36
88	Luis Moco	Completed	1:47.38
89	Seddrick Bassett	Completed	1:47.76
90	Nick Kostner	Completed	1:48.48
91	Adam Grossman	Completed	1:49.08
92	Victor Rivera	Completed	1:51.15
93	Logan Cruz	Completed	1:51.41
94	Patrick McGrath	Completed	1:51.84
95	Jamie Rahn	Completed	1:52.62
96	Ben Musholt	Completed	1:55.12
97	Brian Unger	Completed	1:56.46
98	Adam Hughes	Completed	1:56.69
99	Josh Kronberg	Completed	1:58.87
100	Kody Klein	Completed	1:59.89
101	Gabe Arnold	Completed	2:01.00
102	Ryan Stevens	Completed	2:01.24
103	Kevin Arehart	Completed	2:01.27
104	Cade Halada	Completed	2:01.46
105	Mike Bernardo	Completed	2:04.75
106	Angelo Dela Cruz	Completed	2:05.40
107	Bob Pondrom	Completed	2:05.86
108	John Strzepek	Completed	2:06.09
109	Adam Kezele	Completed	2:07.50
110	Miguel Gonzalez	Completed	2:08.73
111	Tremayne Dortch	Completed	2:15.14
112	Marcus Ramos	Completed	2:15.33
113	Kyle Stokes	Completed	2:16.33
114	James Hardin	Completed	2:16.86
115	Michael Wenger	Completed	2:20.02
116	Andres De La Rosa	Completed	2:20.05
117	Chris Miller	Completed	2:22.17
118	Johnathan Morin	Completed	2:27.39
119	Kelvin Antoine	Completed	2:29.97
120	Christopher DiGangi	Completed	2:41.91
121	Carlos Solis	Completed	2:42.00
122	Travis Weinand	Completed	2:51.83
123	Andrew Wood	Completed	2:52.77
124	Adam Kosak	Completed	2:55.88
125	Drew Howard	Completed	3:06.15
126	Richie Wight	Completed	3:06.75
127	Tom Hutchman	Completed	3:07.54
128	Jack Morgan	Failed	Warped Wall (0:35.76)
129	Jaret Salas	Failed	Warped Wall (0:43.68)
130	Caine Sinclair	Failed	Warped Wall (0:44.40)
131	Angel Flores	Failed	Warped Wall (0:44.81)
132	Eric Davies	Failed	Warped Wall (0:45.73)
133	Matthew Conway	Failed	Warped Wall (0:45.78)
134	Travis Brewer	Failed	Warped Wall (0:48.94)
135	David Money	Failed	Warped Wall (0:49.53)
136	David Cabrera	Failed	Warped Wall (0:49.63)
137	James Jacoy	Failed	Warped Wall (0:50.23)
138	Nathaniel Spencer	Failed	Warped Wall (0:50.46)
139	Brent Haddock	Failed	Warped Wall (0:50.82)
140	Justin D'Avila	Failed	Warped Wall (0:51.12)
141	Jared "J.J." Woods	Failed	Warped Wall (0:51.58)
142	Michael Cusic	Failed	Warped Wall (0:51.63)
143	Justin Dickstein	Failed	Warped Wall (0:53.43)
144	Darrel Robertson	Failed	Warped Wall (0:53.57)
145	Sean Noble	Failed	Warped Wall (0:53.69)
146	Amos Rendao	Failed	Warped Wall (0:54.36)
147	Eric Sietsema	Failed	Warped Wall (0:54.50)
148	Will Dodd	Failed	Warped Wall (0:54.85)
149	Erick Eischen	Failed	Warped Wall (0:54.88)
150	Scott Robinson	Failed	Warped Wall (0:55.30)
151	Arthur Skov	Failed	Warped Wall (0:56.17)
152	Phillip Michou	Failed	Warped Wall (0:57.19)
153	Ben Snead	Failed	Warped Wall (0:57.36)
154	Michael Silenzi	Failed	Warped Wall (0:57.39)
155	David Seitz	Failed	Warped Wall (0:58.04)
156	Niko Bogucki	Failed	Warped Wall (0:58.05)
157	Khalil Uqdah	Failed	Warped Wall (1:00.91)
158	Dan Galiczynski	Failed	Warped Wall (1:01.67)
159	Joseph Duncan	Failed	Warped Wall (1:02.10)
160	Michael Lee	Failed	Warped Wall (1:02.19)
161	George Murphy	Failed	Warped Wall (1:02.25)
162	John Sapinoso	Failed	Warped Wall (1:03.93)
163	Timothy Oliphant	Failed	Warped Wall (1:04.82)
164	Nickolas "Nick Lovin" Stephforn	Failed	Warped Wall (1:04.91)
165	Nate Aye	Failed	Warped Wall (1:04.94)
166	Joshua Tate	Failed	Warped Wall (1:05.51)
167	Matt Laessig	Failed	Warped Wall (1:05.84)
168	Justin West	Failed	Warped Wall (1:06.00)
169	Paul O'Connor	Failed	Warped Wall (1:08.86)
170	Patrick Cusic	Failed	Warped Wall (1:08.94)
171	Arthur Hinton	Failed	Warped Wall (1:10.33)
172	Ryan Seagert	Failed	Warped Wall (1:11.59)
173	Jacob Siler	Failed	Warped Wall (1:13.78)
174	Jeremy Allen	Failed	Warped Wall (1:15.80)
175	Bryant Edwards	Failed	Warped Wall (1:20.76)
176	Michael Pericoloso	Failed	Warped Wall (1:22.28)
177	Shaun Antonio	Failed	Warped Wall (1:30.76)
178	Chris Swartz	Failed	Warped Wall (1:32.47)
179	Matt Mings	Failed	Warped Wall (1:35.16)
180	Bradley Smith Jr.	Failed	Warped Wall (1:37.71)
181	Brad Martin	Failed	Warped Wall (1:42.54)

== Regional Finals ==
The 30 competitors from qualifying in each region tackled an extended course, featuring three new additional obstacles like the Salmon Ladder and Cargo Climb. The top 15 competitors that went the farthest the fastest would move on to the national finals in Las Vegas.

=== Southwest Regional Finals ===
Order #	Competitor	Outcome	Obstacle/Result
1	Evan Dollard	Completed	3:03.99
2	Jesse La Flair	Completed	3:04.99
3	Kole Stevens	Completed	3:07.82
4	Remi Bakkar	Completed	3:12.74
5	Brent Steffensen	Completed	3:18.03
6	Chad Simpson	Completed	3:20.27
7	Derek Nakamoto	Completed	3:36.17
8	Dorian Cedars	Completed	3:36.78
9	Paul Darnell	Completed	3:43.59
10	Dan Mast	Completed	3:46.75
11	Sedrick Bassett	Completed	4:29.48
12	Ryan Thompson	Completed	4:39.32
13	Dylan Curry	Completed	5:09.72
14	Ronnie Shalvis Jr.	Failed	Arm Rings (1:32.05)
15	Michael "Frosti" Zernow	Failed	Arm Rings (2:08.05)

=== Midwest Regional Finals ===
Order #	Competitor	Outcome	Obstacle/Result
1	Matthew Derouen	Completed	2:25.28
2	Andrew Karsen	Completed	3:15.47
3	Jack Morgan	Completed	3:26.47
4	Stephen Volcko	Completed	3:35.97
5	Arthur Skov	Completed	3:45.53
6	Michael Silenzi	Completed	4:18.73
7	Nickolas "Nick Lovin" Stephforn	Completed	4:30.27
8	Johnathan Morin	Completed	5:44.41
9	Scott Robinson	Failed	Lamp Grasper (1:28.12)
10	Will Dodd	Failed	Lamp Grasper (1:32.36)
11	Joshua Grant	Failed	Lamp Grasper (1:43.28)
12	Andrew Lowes	Failed	Lamp Grasper (1:53.96)
13	Nate Aye	Failed	Lamp Grasper (2:18.41)
14	Nick Kostner	Failed	Lamp Grasper (2:54.60)
15	Cade Halada	Failed	Lamp Grasper (3:01.00)

=== Northeast Regional Finals ===
Order #	Competitor	Outcome	Obstacle/Result
1	Tim Shieff	Completed	2:43.55
2	Luis Moco	Completed	2:49.35
3	Dan Galiczynski	Completed	2:49.84
4	Chris Wilczewski	Completed	2:56.30
5	Elet Hall	Completed	3:01.84
6	Travis Graves	Completed	3:21.46
7	Jesse Villarreal	Completed	3:32.70
8	Christopher DiGangi	Completed	4:07.20
9	Andrew Wood	Failed	Salmon Ladder (1:31.60)
10	Danny Johnson	Failed	Salmon Ladder (1:32.50)
11	Bradley Smith Jr.	Failed	Salmon Ladder (1:45.11)
12	Phillip Pirollo	Failed	Salmon Ladder (2:05.48)
13	John Sapinoso	Failed	Warped Wall (1:02.03)
14	Matt Mings	Failed	Warped Wall (1:09.77)
15	Michael Pericoloso	Failed	Warped Wall (1:17.90)

=== Northwest Regional Finals ===
Order #	Competitor	Outcome	Obstacle/Result
1	James McGrath	Completed	2:12.21
2	Travis Furlanic	Completed	2:28.56
3	David Campbell	Completed	2:43.70
4	Sean Noble	Completed	3:16.51
5	Kyle Cochran	Completed	3:19.32
6	Justin Sweeny	Completed	3:25.44
7	Josh Horsley	Completed	3:48.76
8	Nathan Sausedo	Completed	3:49.41
9	Justin Walcker	Completed	3:57.92
10	J.B. Douglas	Completed	3:59.35
11	Kevan Reoli	Completed	4:12.37
12	Ben Snead	Completed	4:44.05
13	Brian Kretsch	Completed	5:07.02
14	Gunner Bahn	Completed	5:14.94
15	Patrick McGrath	Completed	6:03.58
16	Andres De La Rosa	Completed	6:40.10

=== Midsouth Regional Finals ===
Order #	Competitor	Outcome	Obstacle/Result
1	Paul Kasemir	Completed	2:23.22
2	Brandon Douglass	Completed	2:29.41
3	Brian Arnold	Completed	2:30.72
4	Jaret Salas	Completed	2:43.41
5	Kevin Klein	Completed	2:56.28
6	Sat Khalsa	Completed	2:56.90
7	Ahmed Toure	Completed	2:59.70
8	Josh Lobeck	Completed	3:04.64
9	Lorin Ball	Completed	3:20.52
10	Jake Smith	Completed	3:45.40
11	Bob Pondrom	Completed	3:48.06
12	Nathaniel Spencer	Completed	3:50.80
13	James Wyatt	Completed	3:57.82
14	Tremayne Dortch	Completed	5:19.63
15	Alan Connealy	Failed	Lamp Grasper (1:38.11)

=== Southeast Regional Finals ===
Order #	Competitor	Outcome	Obstacle/Result
1	David "Flip" Rodriguez	Completed	2:02.55
2	Drew Drechsel	Completed	2:04.10
3	Travis Rosen	Completed	2:12.44
4	Jared "J.J." Woods	Completed	2:19.19
5	Michael Eckert	Completed	2:20.96
6	Bull Bullard	Completed	2:27.41
7	Sean Morris	Completed	2:31.34
8	William Brown	Completed	2:38.53
9	Thomas Hall	Completed	2:52.81
10	Brendan Kelly	Completed	2:53.74
11	Andy Taylor	Completed	2:58.30
12	Adam Grossman	Completed	3:01.12
13	Niko Bogucki	Completed	3:27.19
14	Tony Reddick	Completed	3:28.50
15	Paul O'Connor	Completed	3:29.01
16	Kamerion Wimbley	Completed	4:25.08
17	Ryan Saegert	Completed	4:26.66
18	Patrick Cusic	Completed	4:35.22

=== Venice Beach Finals Leaderboard ===
Order #	Competitor	Outcome	Obstacle/Result
1	James McGrath	Completed	2:12.21
2	Travis Furlanic	Completed	2:28.56
3	David Campbell	Completed	2:43.70
4	Evan Dollard	Completed	3:03.99
5	Jesse La Flair	Completed	3:04.99
6	Kole Stevens	Completed	3:07.82
7	Remi Bakkar	Completed	3:12.74
8	Sean Noble	Completed	3:16.51
9	Brent Steffensen	Completed	3:18.03
10	Kyle Cochran	Completed	3:19.32
11	Chad Simpson	Completed	3:20.27
12	Justin Sweeny	Completed	3:25.44
13	Derek Nakamoto	Completed	3:36.17
14	Dorian Cedars	Completed	3:36.78
15	Paul Darnell	Completed	3:43.59
16	Dan Mast	Completed	3:46.75
17	Josh Horsley	Completed	3:48.76
18	Nathan Sausedo	Completed	3:49.41
19	Justin Walcker	Completed	3:57.92
20	J.B. Douglas	Completed	3:59.35
21	Kevan Reoli	Completed	4:12.37
22	Sedrick Bassett	Completed	4:29.48
23	Ryan Thompson	Completed	4:39.32
24	Ben Snead	Completed	4:44.05
25	Brian Kretsch	Completed	5:07.02
26	Dylan Curry	Completed	5:09.72
27	Gunner Bahn	Completed	5:14.94
28	Patrick McGrath	Completed	6:03.58
29	Andres De La Rosa	Completed	6:40.10
30	Ronnie Shalvis Jr.	Failed	Arm Rings (1:32.05)
31	Michael "Frosti" Zernow	Failed	Arm Rings (2:08.05)

=== Dallas Finals Leaderboard ===
Order #	Competitor	Outcome	Obstacle/Result
1	Paul Kasemir	Completed	2:23.22
2	Matthew Derouen	Completed	2:25.28
3	Brandon Douglass	Completed	2:29.41
4	Brian Arnold	Completed	2:30.72
5	Jaret Salas	Completed	2:43.41
6	Kevin Klein	Completed	2:56.28
7	Sat Khalsa	Completed	2:56.89
8	Ahmed Toure	Completed	2:59.70
9	Josh Lobeck	Completed	3:04.64
10	Andrew Karsen	Completed	3:15.47
11	Lorin Ball	Completed	3:20.52
12	Jack Morgan	Completed	3:26.47
13	Stephen Volcko	Completed	3:35.97
14	Jake Smith	Completed	3:45.40
15	Arthur Skov	Completed	3:45.53
16	Bob Pondrom	Completed	3:48.06
17	Nathaniel Spencer	Completed	3:50.80
18	James Wyatt	Completed	3:57.82
19	Michael Silenzi	Completed	4:18.73
20	Nickolas "Nick Lovin" Stephforn	Completed	4:30.27
21	Tremayne Dortch	Completed	5:19.63
22	Johnathan Morin	Completed	5:44.41
23	Scott Robinson	Failed	Lamp Grasper (1:28.12)
24	Will Dodd	Failed	Lamp Grasper (1:32.36)
25	Alan Connealy	Failed	Lamp Grasper (1:38.11)
26	Joshua Grant	Failed	Lamp Grasper (1:43.28)
27	Andrew Lowes	Failed	Lamp Grasper (1:53.96)
28	Nate Aye	Failed	Lamp Grasper (2:18.41)
29	Nick Kostner	Failed	Lamp Grasper (2:54.60)
30	Cade Halada	Failed	Lamp Grasper (3:01.00)

=== Miami Finals Leaderboard ===
Order #	Competitor	Outcome	Obstacle/Result
1	David "Flip" Rodriguez	Completed	2:02.55
2	Drew Drechsel	Completed	2:04.10
3	Travis Rosen	Completed	2:12.44
4	Jared "J.J." Woods	Completed	2:19.19
5	Michael Eckert	Completed	2:20.96
6	Bull Bullard	Completed	2:27.41
7	Sean Morris	Completed	2:31.34
8	William Brown	Completed	2:38.53
9	Tim Shieff	Completed	2:43.55
10	Luis Moco	Completed	2:49.35
11	Dan Galiczynski	Completed	2:49.84
12	Thomas Hall	Completed	2:52.81
13	Brendan Kelly	Completed	2:53.74
14	Chris Wilczewski	Completed	2:56.30
15	Andy Taylor	Completed	2:58.30
16	Adam Grossman	Completed	3:01.12
17	Elet Hall	Completed	3:01.84
18	Travis Graves	Completed	3:21.46
19	Niko Bogucki	Completed	3:27.19
20	Tony Reddick	Completed	3:28.50
21	Paul O'Connor	Completed	3:29.01
22	Jesse Villarreal	Completed	3:32.70
23	Christopher DiGangi	Completed	4:07.20
24	Kamerion Wimbley	Completed	4:25.08
25	Ryan Saegert	Completed	4:26.66
26	Patrick Cusic	Completed	4:35.22
27	Andrew Wood	Failed	Salmon Ladder (1:31.60)
28	Danny Johnson	Failed	Salmon Ladder (1:32.50)
29	Bradley Smith Jr.	Failed	Salmon Ladder (1:45.11)
30	Phillip Pirollo	Failed	Salmon Ladder (2:05.48)
31	John Sapinoso	Failed	Warped Wall (1:02.03)
32	Matt Mings	Failed	Warped Wall (1:09.77)
33	Michael Pericoloso	Failed	Warped Wall (1:17.90)

=== Regional Finals Leaderboard ===
Order #	Competitor	Outcome	Obstacle/Result
1	David "Flip" Rodriguez	Completed	2:02.55
2	Drew Drechsel	Completed	2:04.10
3	James McGrath	Completed	2:12.21
4	Travis Rosen	Completed	2:12.44
5	Jared "J.J." Woods	Completed	2:19.19
6	Michael Eckert	Completed	2:20.96
7	Paul Kasemir	Completed	2:23.22
8	Matthew Derouen	Completed	2:25.28
9	Bull Bullard	Completed	2:27.41
10	Travis Furlanic	Completed	2:28.56
11	Brandon Douglass	Completed	2:29.41
12	Brian Arnold	Completed	2:30.72
13	Sean Morris	Completed	2:31.34
14	William Brown	Completed	2:38.53
15	Jaret Salas	Completed	2:43.41
16	Tim Shieff	Completed	2:43.55
17	David Campbell	Completed	2:43.70
18	Luis Moco	Completed	2:49.35
19	Dan Galiczynski	Completed	2:49.84
20	Thomas Hall	Completed	2:52.81
21	Brendan Kelly	Completed	2:53.74
22	Kevin Klein	Completed	2:56.28
23	Chris Wilczewski	Completed	2:56.30
24	Sat Khalsa	Completed	2:56.89
25	Andy Taylor	Completed	2:58.30
26	Ahmed Toure	Completed	2:59.70
27	Adam Grossman	Completed	3:01.12
28	Elet Hall	Completed	3:01.84
29	Evan Dollard	Completed	3:03.99
30	Josh Lobeck	Completed	3:04.64
31	Jesse La Flair	Completed	3:04.99
32	Kole Stevens	Completed	3:07.82
33	Remi Bakkar	Completed	3:12.74
34	Andrew Karsen	Completed	3:15.47
35	Sean Noble	Completed	3:16.51
36	Brent Steffensen	Completed	3:18.03
37	Kyle Cochran	Completed	3:19.32
38	Chad Simpson	Completed	3:20.27
39	Lorin Ball	Completed	3:20.52
40	Travis Graves	Completed	3:21.46
41	Justin Sweeney	Completed	3:25.44
42	Jack Morgan	Completed	3:26.47
43	Niko Bogucki	Completed	3:27.19
44	Tony Reddick	Completed	3:28.50
45	Paul O'Connor	Completed	3:29.01
46	Jesse Villarreal	Completed	3:32.70
47	Stephen Volcko	Completed	3:35.97
48	Derek Nakamoto	Completed	3:36.17
49	Dorian Cedars	Completed	3:36.78
50	Paul Darnell	Completed	3:43.59
51	Jake Smith	Completed	3:45.40
52	Arthur Skov	Completed	3:45.53
53	Dan Mast	Completed	3:46.75
54	Bob Pondrom	Completed	3:48.06
55	Josh Horsley	Completed	3:48.76
56	Nathan Sausedo	Completed	3:49.41
57	Nathaniel Spencer	Completed	3:50.80
58	James Wyatt	Completed	3:57.82
59	Justin Walcker	Completed	3:57.92
60	J.B. Douglas	Completed	3:59.35
61	Christopher DiGangi	Completed	4:07.20
62	Kevan Reoli	Completed	4:12.37
63	Michael Silenzi	Completed	4:18.73
64	Kamerion Wimbley	Completed	4:25.08
65	Ryan Saegert	Completed	4:26.66
66	Seddrick Bassett	Completed	4:29.48
67	Nickolas "Nick Lovin" Stephforn	Completed	4:30.27
68	Patrick Cusic	Completed	4:35.22
69	Ryan Thompson	Completed	4:39.32
70	Ben Snead	Completed	4:44.05
71	Brian Kretsch	Completed	5:07.02
72	Dylan Curry	Completed	5:09.72
73	Gunner Bahn	Completed	5:14.94
74	Tremayne Dortch	Completed	5:19.63
75	Johnathan Morin	Completed	5:44.41
76	Patrick McGrath	Completed	6:03.58
77	Andres De La Rosa	Completed	6:40.10
78	Scott Robinson	Failed	Lamp Grasper (1:28.12)
79	Ronnie Shalvis Jr.	Failed	Arm Rings (1:32.05)
80	Will Dodd	Failed	Lamp Grasper (1:32.36)
81	Alan Connealy	Failed	Lamp Grasper (1:38.11)
82	Joshua Grant	Failed	Lamp Grasper (1:43.28)
83	Andrew Lowes	Failed	Lamp Grasper (1:53.96)
84	Michael "Frosti" Zernow	Failed	Arm Rings (2:08.05)
85	Nate Aye	Failed	Lamp Grasper (2:18.41)
86	Nick Kostner	Failed	Lamp Grasper (2:54.60)
87	Cade Halada	Failed	Lamp Grasper (3:01.00)
88	Andrew Wood	Failed	Salmon Ladder (1:31.60)
89	Danny Johnson	Failed	Salmon Ladder (1:32.50)
90	Bradley Smith Jr.	Failed	Salmon Ladder (1:45.11)
91	Phillip Pirollo	Failed	Salmon Ladder (2:05.48)
92	John Sapinoso	Failed	Warped Wall (1:02.03)
93	Matt Mings	Failed	Warped Wall (1:09.77)
94	Michael Pericoloso	Failed	Warped Wall (1:17.90)

== Notable competitors ==
- Professional Parkour Athlete and Freerunner Brian Orosco
- British film actor William Moseley
- Tennessee Titans defensive end Kamerion Wimbley
- Stuntman Dan Mast
- Stuntwoman Luci Romberg
- "Roam" (a.k.a. A.J. Amores) and "Chairman Platinum" from MMO video game company Artix Entertainment
- Harlem Globetrotters basketball player Bull Bullard
- Devin Thorpe aka Grim Leaper from Fly or Die Freerunning
- Survivor China Contestant Michael "Frosti" Zernow

== Mount Midoriyama ==
=== Legend ===
The competitor cleared that stage.
The competitor is female.
The competitor ran out of time on the obstacle.
The competitor withdrew from competition.

For the first time in the history of the series, rather than traveling to Japan to compete on Sasuke, 100 finalists from the regional qualifying and finals competed in the National Finals at Mount Midoriyama that was built just off the Las Vegas Strip.

=== Stage 1 ===
Order #	Finalist	Result	Notes
1	Cade Halada	4. Jumping Spider	
2	Michael "Frosti" Zernow	4. Jumping Spider	
3	Tom Hutchman (Wildcard)	3. Giant Swing	
4	Matt Mings	4. Jumping Spider	Digest.
5	Brian Kretsch	4. Jumping Spider	Digest.
6	Dylan Curry	4. Jumping Spider	Digest.
	Patrick McGrath	Withdrew	Did not compete due to personal conflicts.
7	Andres De La Rosa (Replacement)	4. Jumping Spider	Digest.
8	Ronnie Shalvis Sr. (Wildcard)	4. Jumping Spider	Digest.
9	Ronnie Shalvis Jr.	4. Jumping Spider	
10	Paul O'Connor	5. Half Pipe Attack	
11	James Wyatt	5. Half Pipe Attack	
12	Tony Reddick	3. Giant Swing	Digest.
13	Nate Aye	3. Giant Swing	Digest.
14	Alan Connealy	5. Half Pipe Attack	Digest.
15	Tremayne Dortch	5. Half Pipe Attack	Digest.
	Travis Furlanic	Withdrew	Did not compete due to legal reasons.
16	Marcus Ramos (Replacement)	3. Giant Swing	
17	Natalie Strasser (Wildcard)	2. Rolling Log	
	Andy Taylor	Withdrew	Did not compete due to medical reasons.
18	Ben Wicks (Replacement)	6. Warped Wall	Digest. Timed out.
19	John Sapinoso	6. Warped Wall	Digest. Timed out.
20	Ryan Saegert (Wildcard)	6. Warped Wall	Digest. Timed out.
21	Patrick Cusic (Wildcard)	6. Warped Wall	Digest. Timed out.
22	Gunner Bahn	5. Half Pipe Attack	
23	Nathaniel Spencer	Completed	2:10.00
24	Michael Pericoloso	5. Half Pipe Attack	Digest.
25	Nick Kostner	8. Final Climb	Digest. Timed out at the Cargo Net.
26	Andrew Lowes	7. Spinning Bridge	Digest.
27	Phillip Pirollo	7. Spinning Bridge	
	Seddrick Bassett	Withdrew	Did not compete due to unknown reason.
28	David Money (Replacement)	8. Final Climb	Timed out after reaching the Cargo Net.
29	Bradley Smith Jr.	4. Jumping Spider	
30	Josh Grant	7. Spinning Bridge	
31	Ben Snead	Completed	1:47.02
32	Niko Bogucki	6. Warped Wall	Digest. Timed out.
33	Adam Grossman	3. Giant Swing	Digest.
34	Danny Johnson	Completed	1:42.31 Digest.
35	Will Dodd	Completed	2:02.33 Digest.
36	Kevan Reoli	2. Rolling Log	
37	Bob Pondrom	3. Giant Swing	
38	Ryoga Vee (Wildcard)	6. Warped Wall	Timed out.
39	Andrew Wood	1. Step Slider	Digest.
40	Scott Robinson	4. Jumping Spider	Digest.
41	Brendan Kelly	4. Jumping Spider	
42	Dan Mast	5. Half Pipe Attack	
43	Paul Darnell	Completed	1:44.98
44	Ryan Thompson	5. Half Pipe Attack	
45	Thomas Hall	7. Spinning Bridge	Digest.
46	J.B. Douglas	Completed	1:57.50 Digest.
47	Jake Smith	6. Warped Wall	Timed out.
48	Dorian Cedars	8. Final Climb	Timed out before hitting the buzzer.
49	Justin Walcker	4. Jumping Spider	
50	Joyce Shahboz (Wildcard)	2. Rolling Log	
51	Jesse Villarreal	7. Spinning Bridge	
52	Christopher DiGangi	4. Jumping Spider	Digest.
53	Chad Simpson	4. Jumping Spider	Digest.
54	Nathan Sausedo	2. Rolling Log	Digest.
55	Nickolas "Nick-Lovin" Stephforn	7. Spinning Bridge	
56	Sean Morris	7. Spinning Bridge	
57	Michael Silenzi	6. Warped Wall	Digest. Timed out.
58	Josh Horsley	6. Warped Wall	Digest. Timed out.
59	Thomas Hall	7. Spinning Bridge	Digest.
60	Jonathan Morin	4. Jumping Spider	
61	Lorin Ball	Completed	1:36.87
62	Risa Scott (Wildcard)	1. Step Slider	Digest.
63	William Brown	4. Jumping Spider	Digest. Failed at the Spider Walk portion of the obstacle.
64	Sat Khalsa	7. Spinning Bridge	Digest.
65	Josh Lobeck	Completed	2:06.08 Digest.
66	Ahmed Toure	Completed	1:47.93
67	Bull Bullard	8. Final Climb	Timed out at the Cargo Net.
68	Derek Nakamoto	Completed	1:34.20 Fastest Stage One clear of this season.
69	Kevin Klein	4. Jumping Spider	
70	Stephen Volcko	4. Jumping Spider	
71	Michael Eckert	4. Jumping Spider	Digest.
72	Arthur Skov	4. Jumping Spider	Digest.
73	Selena Laniel (Wildcard)	4. Jumping Spider	Last Woman Standing.
74	Remi Bakkar	Completed	1:50.98
75	Jaret Salas	6. Warped Wall	Digest. Timed out.
76	Justin Sweeney	7. Spinning Bridge	Digest.
77	Jared "J.J." Woods	5. Half Pipe Attack	
78	Kelvin Antoine (Wildcard)	3. Giant Swing	Lost his balance at the landing and went off the course.
79	Elet Hall	Completed	1:46.00 Digest.
80	Chris Wilczewski	Completed	2:01.26 Digest.
81	Brent Steffensen	Completed	1:41.00
82	Dan Galiczynski	4. Jumping Spider	Digest.
83	Jack Morgan	3. Giant Swing	Digest.
84	Sean Noble	Completed	1:53.20 Digest.
85	Kyle Cochran	7. Spinning Bridge	
86	Travis Rosen	Completed	1:51.00 Digest.
87	Brian Arnold	Completed	1:58.16 Digest.
88	Kole Stevens	Completed	1:42.33
89	Andrew Karsen	5. Half Pipe Attack	
90	Luis Moco	6. Warped Wall	Timed out. Re-injured his knee at the Giant Swing and the Jumping Spider.
91	Jesse La Flair	4. Jumping Spider	Digest.
92	Drew Drechsel	Completed	1:46.08
93	Brandon Douglass	Completed	1:53.18 Digest.
94	David Campbell	7. Spinning Bridge	
95	Evan Dollard	Completed	1:58.10
96	Matthew Derouen	1. Step Slider	Digest.
97	James McGrath	Completed	1:51.61 Digest.
98	Tim Shieff	7. Spinning Bridge	
99	Paul Kasemir	Completed	1:48.29
100	David "Flip" Rodriguez	Completed	1:51.66

=== Leaderboard ===
Order #	Finalist	Result	Notes
1	Derek Nakamoto	Completed	1:34.20
2	Lorin Ball	Completed	1:36.87
3	Brent Steffensen	Completed	1:41.00
4	Danny Johnson	Completed	1:42.31
5	Kole Stevens	Completed	1:42.33
6	Paul Darnell	Completed	1:44.98
7	Elet Hall	Completed	1:46.00
8	Drew Drechsel	Completed	1:46.08
9	Ben Snead	Completed	1:47.02
10	Ahmed Toure	Completed	1:47.93
11	Paul Kasemir	Completed	1:48.29
12	Remi Bakkar	Completed	1:50.98
13	Travis Rosen	Completed	1:51.00
14	James McGrath	Completed	1:51.61
15	David "Flip" Rodriguez	Completed	1:51.66
16	Brandon Douglass	Completed	1:53.18
17	Sean Noble	Completed	1:53.20
18	J.B. Douglas	Completed	1:57.50
19	Brian Arnold	Completed	1:58.16
20	Evan Dollard	Completed	1:59.57
21	Chris Wilczewski	Completed	2:01.26
22	Will Dodd	Completed	2:02.23
23	Josh Lobeck	Completed	2:06.08
24	Nathaniel Spencer	Completed	2:10.00

=== Stage 2 ===
Order #	Finalist	Result	Notes
1	Nathaniel Spencer	2. Double Salmon Ladder	Fifth level.
2	Chris Wilczewski	1. Slider Drop	Lost grip on drop.
3	Will Dodd	2. Double Salmon Ladder	Digest. Fifth level.
4	Sean Noble	3. Unstable Bridge	Failed dismount.
5	Brian Arnold	4. Balance Tank	Fell halfway through.
6	Evan Dollard	2. Double Salmon Ladder	Seventh level.
7	J.B. Douglas	3. Unstable Bridge	Digest. Transition to second board.
8	Brandon Douglass	3. Unstable Bridge	Transition to second board.
9	Travis Rosen	4. Balance Tank	Fell at beginning.
10	Josh Lobeck	2. Double Salmon Ladder	Digest. Seventh level.
11	Paul Kasemir	5. Metal Spin	Lost grip on chain.
12	Ben Snead	2. Double Salmon Ladder	Digest. Seventh level.
13	Elet Hall	3. Unstable Bridge	Digest. Transition to second board.
14	James McGrath	1. Slider Drop	Derailed bar on drop.
15	Remi Bakkar	2. Double Salmon Ladder	Seventh level.
16	Drew Drechsel	3. Unstable Bridge	Failed dismount.
17	Ahmed Toure	4. Balance Tank	Fell 4/5 of the way through.
18	Danny Johnson	2. Double Salmon Ladder	Digest. Seventh level.
19	Brent Steffensen	Completed	1:44.97
20	Kole Stevens	1. Slider Drop	Digest. Derailed bar on drop.
21	David “Flip” Rodriguez	4. Balance Tank	Fell at beginning.
22	Lorin Ball	2. Double Salmon Ladder	Digest. Seventh level.
23	Paul Darnell	3. Unstable Bridge	Lost grip on first board.
24	Derek Nakamoto	5. Metal Spin	Lost grip on chain.

=== Leaderboard ===
Order #	Finalist	Result	Notes
1	Brent Steffensen	Completed	1:44.97

=== Stage 3 ===
Order #	Finalist	Result	Notes
1	Brent Steffensen	6. Hang Climb	Fell about 3/4 up.

== Ratings ==
Network	Episode		Air date	Timeslot	Rating/Share (18–49)		Viewers (millions)	Ref.
G4	1	"Southwest Regional Qualifying Part 1 of 2"	May 20, 2012	Sunday 9:00 p.m.	0.2	N/A	0.338	
G4	2	"Southwest Regional Qualifying Part 2 of 2"	May 20, 2012	Sunday 10:00 p.m.	0.1	N/A	0.273	
NBC	3	"Southwest Regional Finals"	May 21, 2012	Monday 9:00 p.m.	2.4	6	6.200	
G4	4	"Midwest Regional Qualifying Part 1 of 2"	May 27, 2012	Sunday 9:00 p.m.	0.1	N/A	0.233	
G4	5	"Midwest Regional Qualifying Part 2 of 2"	May 27, 2012	Sunday 10:00 p.m.	0.1	N/A	0.193	
NBC	6	"Midwest Regional Finals"	May 28, 2012	Monday 9:00 p.m.	2.1	5	5.790	
G4	7	"Northeast Regional Qualifying Part 1 of 2"	June 3, 2012	Sunday 9:00 p.m.	0.2	N/A	0.350	
G4	8	"Northeast Regional Qualifying Part 2 of 2"	June 3, 2012	Sunday 10:00 p.m.	0.2	N/A	0.344	
NBC	9	"Northeast Regional Finals"	June 4, 2012	Monday 9:00 p.m.	2.2	6	6.780	
G4	10	"Northwest Regional Qualifying Part 1 of 2"	June 10, 2012	Sunday 9:00 p.m.	0.2	N/A	0.358	
G4	11	"Northwest Regional Qualifying Part 2 of 2"	June 10, 2012	Sunday 10:00 p.m.	0.2	N/A	0.380	
NBC	12	"Northwest Regional Finals"	June 12, 2012	Tuesday 8:00 p.m.	1.7	5	4.990	
G4	13	"Midsouth Regional Qualifying Part 1 of 2"	June 17, 2012	Sunday 9:00 p.m.	0.1	N/A	0.216	
G4	14	"Midsouth Regional Qualifying Part 2 of 2"	June 17, 2012	Sunday 10:00 p.m.	0.1	N/A	0.250	
NBC	15	"Northwest Regional Finals"	June 18, 2012	Monday 9:00 p.m.	2.0	5	5.780	
G4	16	"Southeast Regional Qualifying Part 1 of 2"	June 24, 2012	Sunday 9:00 p.m.	0.2	N/A	0.410	
G4	17	"Southeast Regional Qualifying Part 2 of 2"	June 24, 2012	Sunday 10:00 p.m.	0.2	N/A	0.421	
NBC	18	"Southeast Regional Finals"	June 25, 2012	Monday 10:00 p.m.	1.9	5	5.700	
G4	19	"Las Vegas Finals Part 1 of 6"	July 8, 2012	Sunday 9:00 p.m.	0.2	N/A	0.358	
G4	20	"Las Vegas Finals Part 2 of 6"	July 8, 2012	Sunday 10:00 p.m.	0.1	N/A	0.265	
G4	21	"Las Vegas Finals Part 3 of 6"	July 8, 2012	Sunday 11:00 p.m.	Unknown			
NBC	22	"Las Vegas Finals Part 4 of 6"	July 9, 2012	Monday 9:00 p.m.	1.4	4	3.990	
NBC	23	"Las Vegas Finals Part 5 of 6"	July 16, 2012	Monday 9:00 p.m.	1.8	5	4.590	
NBC	24	"Las Vegas Finals Part 6 of 6"	July 23, 2012	Monday 9:00 p.m.	2.0	5	4.870	
