= American Ninja Warrior season 6 =

Season of American reality/sport competition television series American Ninja Warrior

American Ninja Warrior
- Season 6
- Hosted by: Matt Iseman; Akbar Gbaja-Biamila; Jenn Brown
- No. of contestants: 600
- Finals venue: Las Vegas, NV
- No. of episodes: 14

Release
- Original network: NBC; Esquire Network
- Original release: May 26 – September 8, 2014

Season chronology
- ← Previous; Season 5 Next → Season 7

The sixth season of American Ninja Warrior premiered on NBC on May 26, 2014. Matt Iseman returned for his sixth season as host, while Akbar Gbaja-Biamila and Jenn Brown each returned for their second season. Similar to previous seasons, the winner receives $500,000 and the coveted title, "American Ninja Warrior".

== Cities ==
In addition to the five cities (Venice Beach, Dallas, St. Louis, Miami, and Denver), the national finals were held once again in Las Vegas, Nevada.

== Obstacles ==
=== City Qualifying & Finals ===
Event		Obstacles										Finishers
Venice Beach	Qualifying	Quintuple Steps	Spinning Wheel	Slack Ladder	Jumping Bars into Cargo Net	Monkey Peg	Warped Wall	N/A				18
Venice Beach	Finals	Quintuple Steps	Spinning Wheel	Slack Ladder	Jumping Bars into Cargo Net	Monkey Peg	Warped Wall	Salmon Ladder	Cannonball Alley	Body Prop	Spider Climb	2
Dallas	Qualifying	Quintuple Steps	Log Grip	Tilting Table	Swing Jump	Ring Toss	Warped Wall	N/A				21
Dallas	Finals	Quintuple Steps	Log Grip	Tilting Table	Swing Jump	Ring Toss	Warped Wall	Salmon Ladder	Swinging Frames	Pole Grasper	Spider Climb	7
St. Louis	Qualifying	Quintuple Steps	Rolling Log	Bridge of Blades	Rope Swing into Cargo Net	Double Tilt Ladder	Warped Wall	N/A				25
St. Louis	Finals	Quintuple Steps	Rolling Log	Bridge of Blades	Rope Swing into Cargo Net	Double Tilt Ladder	Warped Wall	Salmon Ladder	Rumbling Dice	Crazy Cliffhanger	Spider Climb	9
Miami	Qualifying	Quintuple Steps	Downhill Pipe Drop	Dancing Stones	Jump Hang	Curtain Slider	Warped Wall	N/A				42
Miami	Finals	Quintuple Steps	Downhill Pipe Drop	Dancing Stones	Jump Hang	Curtain Slider	Warped Wall	Salmon Ladder	Minefield	Floating Stairs	Spider Climb	7
Denver	Qualifying	Quintuple Steps	Cat Grab	Spinning Log	Spikes into Cargo	Devil Steps	Warped Wall	N/A				22
Denver	Finals	Quintuple Steps	Cat Grab	Spinning Log	Spikes into Cargo	Devil Steps	Warped Wall	Salmon Ladder	Arm Rings	Doorknob Arch	Spider Climb	6

=== National Finals ===
Event	Obstacle(s)								Finishers
Stage 1	Piston Road	Giant Ring	Silk Slider	Jumping Spider	Half Pipe Attack	Warped Wall	Spinning Bridge	Final Climb	18
Stage 2	Rope Jungle	Double Salmon Ladder	Unstable Bridge	Butterfly Wall	Metal Spin	Wall Lift			2
Stage 3	Cannonball Incline	Doorknob Grasper	Floating Boards	Ultimate Cliffhanger	Propeller Bar	Hang Climb	Spider Flip	Flying Bar	0
Stage 4	Rope Climb								N/A

== City Qualifying ==
Regional competitions were held in the following five locations to determine the 90 competitors to participate in the qualifying rounds: Venice Beach, CA, Dallas, TX, St. Louis, MO, Miami, FL, and Denver, CO. The top 30 competitors that went the farthest the fastest would move on to the finals rounds.

=== Venice Beach Qualifying ===
Order #	Competitor	Outcome	Obstacle/Result
1	David Campbell	Completed	1:55.45
2	James McGrath	Completed	1:57.08
3	Alan Connealy	Completed	2:07.23
4	Kevin Bull	Completed	2:28.18
5	Dustin Rocho	Completed	2:32.91
6	Thaddeus Robeck	Completed	2:43.66
7	Derek Nakamoto	Completed	2:58.52
8	Dan Mast	Completed	3:07.34
9	Alex Kane	Completed	3:19.31
10	Kyle Cochran	Completed	3:37.05
11	Travis Brewer	Completed	3:45.07
12	Robert Ing	Completed	4:11.96
13	Ben Melick	Completed	4:20.41
14	Evan Dollard	Completed	4:41.46
15	Dorian Cedars	Completed	4:51.90
16	Andres De La Rosa	Completed	5:16.14
17	James Sclar	Completed	5:29.34
18	Mario Mendoza	Completed	6:58.27
19	Vadym Kuvakin	Failed	Warped Wall (2:20.02)
20	Alexander Gines	Failed	Warped Wall (5:07.12)
21	Keita Kashiwagi	Failed	Warped Wall (5:35.36)
22	Brian Kretsch	Failed	Monkey Peg (0:59.28)
23	David Money	Failed	Monkey Peg (1:08.90)
24	Vadym Krasnenko	Failed	Monkey Peg (1:30.19)
25	Justin Taylor	Failed	Monkey Peg (1:33.57)
26	Danny Goler	Failed	Monkey Peg (1:39.19)
27	Paul Money	Failed	Monkey Peg (1:46.12)
28	Warren Li	Failed	Monkey Peg (2:06.84)
29	Brennan Mejia	Failed	Monkey Peg (2:27.53)
30	Quoc-Hoan Do	Failed	Jumping Bars into Cargo Net (1:10.48)

=== Dallas Qualifying ===
Order #	Competitor	Outcome	Obstacle/Result
1	Dillon Gates	Completed	1:31.19
2	Kevin Klein	Completed	1:33.42
3	Joshua Cook	Completed	1:41.10
4	Raymond Clawson	Completed	1:48.23
5	Jaret Salas	Completed	1:58.62
6	Tremayne Dortch	Completed	2:05.98
7	Seth Blaustein	Completed	2:11.43
8	Jordan Yordanov	Completed	2:13.50
9	Connor Moyer	Completed	2:23.37
10	David Gilbert	Completed	2:33.71
11	Nathan Jasso	Completed	2:43.25
12	Eric McKeethen	Completed	2:54.75
13	Sam Sann	Completed	3:03.51
14	Jimmy Bogle Jr.	Completed	3:04.34
15	Matthew Laessig	Completed	3:04.54
16	Johnathan Morin	Completed	3:06.03
17	Terry Cossey	Completed	3:15.38
18	Jo Jo Bynum	Completed	3:21.17
19	Abel Gonzalez Jr.	Completed	3:29.07
20	Karsten Williams	Completed	3:36.61
21	Kacy Catanzaro	Completed	5:26.18
22	Jeremy Morgan	Failed	Warped Wall (1:10.30)
23	Brandon Pannell	Failed	Warped Wall (1:34.77)
24	Geoffrey Lancaster	Failed	Warped Wall (1:40.11)
25	Michael Solomon	Failed	Warped Wall (1:43.08)
26	Geoffrey Motil	Failed	Warped Wall (2:02.10)
27	Daniel Manuel	Failed	Warped Wall (2:10.39)
28	Joe Calderon	Failed	Warped Wall (2:41.33)
29	Engin Dolen	Failed	Warped Wall (2:53.27)
30	Joshua Stone	Failed	Warped Wall (2:59.64)

=== St. Louis Qualifying ===
Order #	Competitor	Outcome	Obstacle/Result
1	Joe Moravsky	Completed	1:04.13
2	Aaron Himelright	Completed	1:27.19
3	Joseph Hyndman	Completed	1:32.68
4	Michael Needham	Completed	1:35.40
5	Elet Hall	Completed	1:37.05
6	Travis Rosen	Completed	1:39.55
7	Andrew Karsen	Completed	2:02.92
8	Jamie Rahn	Completed	2:04.61
9	Roland Seward	Completed	2:12.78
10	Dan Galiczynski	Completed	2:13.06
11	Adam Arnold	Completed	2:22.53
12	Rob Moravsky	Completed	2:24.80
13	Geoff Britten	Completed	2:25.71
14	Matthew Schumann	Completed	2:34.43
15	Brian Wilczewski	Completed	2:40.67
16	Chris Wilczewski	Completed	2:45.35
17	Brent Ruffin	Completed	2:47.99
18	Mitch Pajcic	Completed	2:55.20
19	Michelle Warnky	Completed	3:08.94
20	Andrew Lowes	Completed	3:14.24
21	Leoniel Olanda	Completed	3:24.58
22	Tom McGregor	Completed	3:29.75
23	Dan Polizzi	Completed	3:30.72
24	David Cavanagh	Completed	3:58.66
25	Adam Mihm	Completed	3:58.66
26	Tukrong "TK" Klengdong	Failed	Warped Wall (1:01.92)
27	Timothy Dauehauer	Failed	Warped Wall (1:29.98)
28	Raymond Butler	Failed	Warped Wall (1:47.16)
29	Brandon Willis	Failed	Warped Wall (1:57.30)
30	Matthew Harris	Failed	Warped Wall (2:07.66)

=== Miami Qualifying ===
Order #	Competitor	Outcome	Obstacle/Result
1	Drew Drechsel	Completed	0:44.24
2	Jonathan Sharp Brown	Completed	0:51.11
3	Luciano Acuna Jr.	Completed	1:00.07
4	William Brown	Completed	1:03.03
5	John Vogt	Completed	1:13.20
6	Joseph Rosello	Completed	1:16.95
7	Idoko Abuh	Completed	1:19.24
8	Neil Craver	Completed	1:23.48
9	Miguel Castillo	Completed	1:23.65
10	Dustin Sanderson	Completed	1:25.05
11	Solomon Harvey	Completed	1:27.88
12	Brett Sims	Completed	1:28.50
13	Kenneth Niemitalo	Completed	1:32.02
14	Jared "J.J." Woods	Completed	1:34.15
15	Stephens Nunnally	Completed	1:34.83
16	Adam Orsini	Completed	1:35.27
17	Michael Eckert	Completed	1:40.39
18	Timothy Koren	Completed	1:40.72
19	Preston Griffall	Completed	1:48.05
20	Ryan Stratis	Completed	1:50.29
21	David Hunt	Completed	1:51.99
22	Kavon Sadier	Completed	1:52.84
23	Brandon Arrington	Completed	2:00.91
24	Adam Grossman	Completed	2:02.69
25	Gabriel Arnold	Completed	2:03.80
26	Reko Rivera	Completed	2:03.91
27	Binny Seth	Completed	2:07.45
28	Rich Thompson	Completed	2:09.88
29	Andy Friedman	Completed	2:11.32
30	Todd Bourgeois	Completed	2:11.92
31	Josh Windbeck	Completed	2:13.75
32	Jonathan Ruiz	Completed	2:30.98
33	Chris Poli	Completed	2:31.06
34	Sean Morris	Completed	2:33.92
35	Dustin McKinney	Completed	2:34.67
36	Felix Chu	Completed	2:39.90
37	Noel Reyes	Completed	2:42.94
38	William Donke II	Completed	2:55.32
39	Daniel Bertrams	Completed	3:06.07
40	Jim Matheis	Completed	3:50.21
41	Matt Zacharkow	Completed	4:02.82
42	Andrew Viscusi	Completed	4:17.47

=== Denver Qualifying ===
Order #	Competitor	Outcome	Obstacle/Result
1	Lorin Ball	Completed	1:04.27
2	Paul Kasemir	Completed	1:09.04
3	Lance Pekus	Completed	1:20.06
4	Daniel Larson-Fine	Completed	1:26.11
5	Justin Kydd	Completed	1:29.97
6	David Schwartz	Completed	1:37.45
7	Kyle Sinacori	Completed	1:41.41
8	Christopher Romrell	Completed	1:46.72
9	Yancey Quezada	Completed	1:56.72
10	Robin Pietschmann	Completed	1:56.79
11	Isaac Caldiero	Completed	1:56.97
12	Karson Voiles	Completed	2:00.36
13	Matthew Wilder	Completed	2:01.23
14	Brian Arnold	Completed	2:32.86
15	Dan Entmacher	Completed	2:37.53
16	Yen Chen	Completed	2:43.53
17	David Bortz	Completed	2:58.25
18	Alex Manikowski	Completed	3:09.04
19	Dr. Noah Kaufman	Completed	3:26.30
20	Josh Newhouse	Completed	3:26.37
21	Ian Dory	Completed	3:35.48
22	Meagan Martin	Completed	4:46.29
23	Keith Peters	Failed	Warped Wall (1:39.91)
24	Phil Gavigan	Failed	Warped Wall (1:56.59)
25	Carl Fantauzzo Jr.	Failed	Warped Wall (2:15.59)
26	Jared Higginson	Failed	Warped Wall (2:20.93)
27	Jon Stewart	Failed	Warped Wall (2:44.30)
28	Joel Brady	Failed	Warped Wall (3:08.18)
29	Ronnie Shalvis Jr.	Failed	Devil Steps (0:31.43)
30	Austin Lutz	Failed	Devil Steps (0:33.21)

=== City Qualifying Leaderboard ===
Order #	Competitor	Outcome	Obstacle/Result
1	Drew Drechsel	Completed	0:44.24
2	Jonathan Sharp Brown	Completed	0:51.11
3	Luciano Acuna Jr.	Completed	1:00.07
4	William Brown	Completed	1:03.03
5	Joe Moravsky	Completed	1:04.13
6	Lorin Ball	Completed	1:04.27
7	Paul Kasemir	Completed	1:09.04
8	John Vogt	Completed	1:13.20
9	Joseph Rosello	Completed	1:16.95
10	Idoko Abuh	Completed	1:19.24
11	Lance Pekus	Completed	1:20.06
12	Neil Craver	Completed	1:23.48
13	Miguel Castillo	Completed	1:23.65
14	Dustin Sanderson	Completed	1:25.05
15	Daniel Larson-Fine	Completed	1:26.11
16	Aaron Himelright	Completed	1:27.19
17	Solomon Harvey	Completed	1:27.88
18	Brett Sims	Completed	1:28.50
19	Justin Kydd	Completed	1:29.97
20	Dillon Gates	Completed	1:31.19
21	Kenneth Niemitalo	Completed	1:32.02
22	Joseph Hyndman	Completed	1:32.68
23	Kevin Klein	Completed	1:33.42
24	Jared "J.J." Woods	Completed	1:34.15
25	Stephens Nunnally	Completed	1:34.83
26	Adam Orsini	Completed	1:35.27
27	Michael Needham	Completed	1:35.40
28	Elet Hall	Completed	1:37.05
29	David Schwartz	Completed	1:37.45
30	Travis Rosen	Completed	1:39.55
31	Michael Eckert	Completed	1:40.39
32	Timothy Koren	Completed	1:40.72
33	Joshua Cook	Completed	1:41.10
34	Kyle Sinacori	Completed	1:41.41
35	Christopher Romrell	Completed	1:46.72
36	Preston Griffall	Completed	1:48.05
37	Raymond Clawson	Completed	1:48.23
38	Ryan Stratis	Completed	1:50.29
39	David Hunt	Completed	1:51.99
40	Kavon Sadier	Completed	1:52.84
41	David Campbell	Completed	1:55.45
42	Yancey Quezada	Completed	1:56.72
43	Robin Pietschmann	Completed	1:56.79
44	Isaac Caldiero	Completed	1:56.97
45	James McGrath	Completed	1:57.08
46	Jaret Salas	Completed	1:58.62
47	Karson Voiles	Completed	2:00.36
48	Brandon Arrington	Completed	2:00.91
49	Matthew Wilder	Completed	2:01.23
50	Adam Grossman	Completed	2:02.69
51	Andrew Karsen	Completed	2:02.92
52	Gabriel Arnold	Completed	2:03.80
53	Reko Rivera	Completed	2:03.91
54	Jamie Rahn	Completed	2:04.61
55	Tremayne Dortch	Completed	2:05.98
56	Alan Connealy	Completed	2:07.23
57	Binny Seth	Completed	2:07.45
58	Rich Thompson	Completed	2:09.88
59	Andy Friedman	Completed	2:11.32
60	Seth Blaustein	Completed	2:11.43
61	Todd Bourgeois	Completed	2:11.92
62	Roland Seward	Completed	2:12.78
63	Dan Galiczynski	Completed	2:13.06
64	Jordan Yordanov	Completed	2:13.50
65	Josh Windbeck	Completed	2:13.75
66	Adam Arnold	Completed	2:22.53
67	Connor Moyer	Completed	2:23.37
68	Rob Moravsky	Completed	2:24.80
69	Geoff Britten	Completed	2:25.71
70	Kevin Bull	Completed	2:28.18
71	Jonathan Ruiz	Completed	2:30.98
72	Chris Poli	Completed	2:31.06
73	Brian Arnold	Completed	2:32.86
74	Dustin Rocho	Completed	2:32.91
75	David Gilbert	Completed	2:33.71
76	Sean Morris	Completed	2:33.92
77	Matthew Schumann	Completed	2:34.43
78	Dustin McKinney	Completed	2:34.67
79	Dan Entmacher	Completed	2:37.53
80	Felix Chu	Completed	2:39.90
81	Brian Wilczewski	Completed	2:40.67
82	Noel Reyes	Completed	2:42.94
83	Nathan Jasso	Completed	2:43.25
84	Yen Chen	Completed	2:43.53
85	Thaddeus Robeck	Completed	2:43.66
86	Chris Wilczewski	Completed	2:45.35
87	Brent Ruffin	Completed	2:47.99
88	Eric McKeethen	Completed	2:54.75
89	Mitch Pajcic	Completed	2:55.20
90	William Donke II	Completed	2:55.32
91	David Bortz	Completed	2:58.25
92	Derek Nakamoto	Completed	2:58.52
93	Sam Sann	Completed	3:03.51
94	Jimmy Bogle Jr.	Completed	3:04.34
95	Matthew Laessig	Completed	3:04.54
96	Johnathan Morin	Completed	3:06.03
97	Daniel Bertrams	Completed	3:06.07
98	Dan Mast	Completed	3:07.34
99	Michelle Warnky	Completed	3:08.94
100	Alex Manikowski	Completed	3:09.04
101	Andrew Lowes	Completed	3:14.24
102	Terry Cossey	Completed	3:15.38
103	Alex Kane	Completed	3:19.31
104	Jo Jo Bynum	Completed	3:21.17
105	Leoniel Olanda	Completed	3:24.58
106	Dr. Noah Kaufman	Completed	3:26.30
107	Josh Newhouse	Completed	3:26.37
108	Abel Gonzalez Jr.	Completed	3:29.07
109	Tom McGregor	Completed	3:29.75
110	Dan Polizzi	Completed	3:30.72
111	Ian Dory	Completed	3:35.48
112	Karsten Williams	Completed	3:36.61
113	Kyle Cochran	Completed	3:37.05
114	Travis Brewer	Completed	3:45.07
115	Jim Matheis	Completed	3:50.21
116	David Cavanagh	Completed	3:58.66
117	Adam Mihm	Completed	3:58.66
118	Matt Zacharkow	Completed	4:02.82
119	Robert Ing	Completed	4:11.96
120	Andrew Viscusi	Completed	4:17.47
121	Ben Melick	Completed	4:20.41
122	Evan Dollard	Completed	4:41.46
123	Meagan Martin	Completed	4:46.29
124	Dorian Cedars	Completed	4:51.90
125	Andres De La Rosa	Completed	5:16.14
126	Kacy Catanzaro	Completed	5:26.18
127	James Sclar	Completed	5:29.34
128	Mario Mendoza	Completed	6:58.27
129	Tukrong "TK" Klengdong	Failed	Warped Wall (1:01.92)
130	Jeremy Morgan	Failed	Warped Wall (1:10.30)
131	Timothy Dauehauer	Failed	Warped Wall (1:29.98)
132	Brandon Pannell	Failed	Warped Wall (1:34.77)
133	Keith Peters	Failed	Warped Wall (1:39.91)
134	Geoffrey Lancaster	Failed	Warped Wall (1:40.11)
135	Michael Solomon	Failed	Warped Wall (1:43.08)
136	Raymond Butler	Failed	Warped Wall (1:47.16)
137	Phil Gavigan	Failed	Warped Wall (1:56.59)
138	Brandon Willis	Failed	Warped Wall (1:57.30)
139	Geoffrey Motil	Failed	Warped Wall (2:02.10)
140	Matthew Harris	Failed	Warped Wall (2:07.66)
141	Daniel Manuel	Failed	Warped Wall (2:10.39)
142	Carl Fantauzzo Jr.	Failed	Warped Wall (2:15.59)
143	Vadym Kuvakin	Failed	Warped Wall (2:20.02)
144	Jared Higginson	Failed	Warped Wall (2:20.93)
145	Joe Calderon	Failed	Warped Wall (2:41.33)
146	Jon Stewart	Failed	Warped Wall (2:44.30)
147	Engin Dolen	Failed	Warped Wall (2:53.27)
148	Joshua Stone	Failed	Warped Wall (2:59.64)
149	Joel Brady	Failed	Warped Wall (3:08.18)
150	Alexander Gines	Failed	Warped Wall (5:07.12)
151	Keita Kashiwagi	Failed	Warped Wall (5:35.36)
152	Ronnie Shalvis Jr.	Failed	Devil Steps (0:31.43)
153	Austin Lutz	Failed	Devil Steps (0:33.21)
154	Brian Kretsch	Failed	Monkey Peg (0:59.28)
155	David Money	Failed	Monkey Peg (1:08.90)
156	Vadym Krasnenko	Failed	Monkey Peg (1:30.19)
157	Justin Taylor	Failed	Monkey Peg (1:33.57)
158	Danny Goler	Failed	Monkey Peg (1:39.19)
159	Paul Money	Failed	Monkey Peg (1:46.12)
160	Warren Li	Failed	Monkey Peg (2:06.84)
161	Brennan Mejia	Failed	Monkey Peg (2:27.53)
162	Quoc-Hoan Do	Failed	Jumping Bars into Cargo Net (1:10.48)

== City Finals ==
The 30 competitors from qualifying in each city tackled an extended course, featuring four new additional obstacles like the Salmon Ladder and Spider Climb. The top 15 competitors that went the farthest the fastest would move on to the national finals in Las Vegas.

=== Venice Beach Finals ===
Order #	Competitor	Outcome	Obstacle/Result
1	David Campbell	Completed	5:53.96
2	Kevin Bull	Completed	5:59.40
3	James McGrath	Failed	Body Prop (2:52.43)
4	Dustin Rocho	Failed	Body Prop (3:39.87)
5	Thaddeus Robeck	Failed	Cannonball Alley (2:26.91)
6	Alan Connealy	Failed	Cannonball Alley (2:44.24)
7	Dorian Cedars	Failed	Cannonball Alley (3:23.82)
8	Vadym Kuvakin	Failed	Cannonball Alley (3:28.04)
9	Derek Nakamoto	Failed	Cannonball Alley (3:36.27)
10	Alex Kane	Failed	Cannonball Alley (3:36.70)
11	Travis Brewer	Failed	Cannonball Alley (3:41.85)
12	Brian Kretsch	Failed	Cannonball Alley (3:42.00)
13	Kyle Cochran	Failed	Cannonball Alley (4:11.14)
14	Robert Ing	Failed	Cannonball Alley (4:11.95)
15	Ben Melick	Failed	Cannonball Alley (4:17.50)

=== Dallas Finals ===
Order #	Competitor	Outcome	Obstacle/Result
1	Jeremy Morgan	Completed	3:30.70
2	Jaret Salas	Completed	4:52.43
3	Tremayne Dortch	Completed	5:23.26
4	Geoffrey Lancaster	Completed	6:35.17
5	Abel Gonzalez	Completed	6:54.96
6	Karsten Williams	Completed	7:26.28
7	Kacy Catanzaro	Completed	8:59.53
8	Kevin Klein	Failed	Pole Grasper (2:34.96)
9	David Gilbert	Failed	Pole Grasper (3:41.06)
10	Cass Clawson	Failed	Swinging Frames (1:59.82)
11	Brandon Pannell	Failed	Swinging Frames (2:26.91)
12	Connor Moyer	Failed	Swinging Frames (2:50.81)
13	Johnathan Morin	Failed	Swinging Frames (4:21.67)
14	Joseph "Jo Jo" Bynum	Failed	Swinging Frames (4:33.78)
15	Sam Sann	Failed	Swinging Frames (4:43.95)

=== St. Louis Finals ===
Order #	Competitor	Outcome	Obstacle/Result
1	Joe Moravsky	Completed	3:40.48
2	Elet Hall	Completed	4:21.16
3	Andrew Karsen	Completed	4:24.12
4	Michael Needham	Completed	4:55.79
5	Dan Galiczynski	Completed	4:56.70
6	Jamie Rahn	Completed	5:31.49
7	Brian Wilczewski	Completed	5:59.88
8	Geoff Britten	Completed	6:39.95
9	Chris Wilczewski	Completed	6:41.77
10	Tukrong "TK" Klengdong	Failed	Crazy Cliffhanger (2:50.13)
11	Travis Rosen	Failed	Crazy Cliffhanger (2:53.55)
12	Aaron Himelright	Failed	Crazy Cliffhanger (3:47.26)
13	Andrew Lowes	Failed	Rumbling Dice (2:44.40)
14	Dan Polizzi	Failed	Rumbling Dice (3:27.02)
15	Matthew Schumann	Failed	Rumbling Dice (3:29.28)

=== Miami Finals ===
Order #	Competitor	Outcome	Obstacle/Result
1	JJ Woods	Completed	4:15.95
2	Kenneth Niemitalo	Completed	4:39.81
3	Ryan Stratis	Completed	5:20.40
4	Solomon Harvey	Completed	5:28.41
5	Stephens Nunnally	Completed	5:40.16
6	Adam Grossman	Completed	6:29.70
7	Noel Reyes	Completed	7:15.95
8	Michael Eckert	Failed	Spider Climb (3:24.46)
9	Dustin McKinney	Failed	Spider Climb (4:04.89)
10	Sean Morris	Failed	Spider Climb (4:49.51)
11	Luciano Acuna Jr.	Failed	Floating Stairs (2:08.92)
12	Jonathan Sharp Brown	Failed	Minefield (2:11.72)
13	Joseph Rosello	Failed	Minefield (2:25.56)
14	Todd Bourgeois	Failed	Minefield (2:36.47)
15	John Vogt	Failed	Minefield (3:39.61)

=== Denver Finals ===
Order #	Competitor	Outcome	Obstacle/Result
1	Isaac Caldiero	Completed	5:48.41
2	Paul Kasemir	Completed	5:57.32
3	Brian Arnold	Completed	8:03.37
4	Ian Dory	Completed	8:11.23
5	Dr. Noah Kaufman	Completed	8:21.61
6	Jon Stewart	Completed	8:58.50
7	Daniel Larson-Fine	Failed	Doorknob Arch (3:29.52)
8	Justin Kydd	Failed	Doorknob Arch (3:31.02)
9	Karson Voiles	Failed	Doorknob Arch (4:01.21)
10	Yen Chen	Failed	Doorknob Arch (4:02.77)
11	Dan Entmacher	Failed	Doorknob Arch (4:22.18)
12	Robin Pietschmann	Failed	Doorknob Arch (4:32.34)
13	Matthew Wilder	Failed	Doorknob Arch (5:04.46)
14	Joel Brady	Failed	Doorknob Arch (6:32.82)
15	Lance Pekus	Failed	Arm Rings (2:52.11)

=== City Finals Leaderboard ===
Order #	Competitor	Outcome	Obstacle/Result
1	Jeremy Morgan	Completed	3:30.70
2	Joe Moravsky	Completed	3:40.48
3	JJ Woods	Completed	4:15.95
4	Elet Hall	Completed	4:21.16
5	Andrew Karsen	Completed	4:24.12
6	Kenneth Niemitalo	Completed	4:39.81
7	Jaret Salas	Completed	4:52.43
8	Michael Needham	Completed	4:55.79
9	Dan Galiczynski	Completed	4:56.70
10	Ryan Stratis	Completed	5:20.40
11	Tremayne Dortch	Completed	5:23.26
12	Solomon Harvey	Completed	5:28.41
13	Jamie Rahn	Completed	5:31.49
14	Stephens Nunnally	Completed	5:40.16
15	Isaac Caldiero	Completed	5:48.41
16	David Campbell	Completed	5:53.96
17	Paul Kasemir	Completed	5:57.32
18	Kevin Bull	Completed	5:59.40
19	Brian Wilczewski	Completed	5:59.88
20	Adam Grossman	Completed	6:29.70
21	Geoffrey Lancaster	Completed	6:35.17
22	Geoff Britten	Completed	6:39.95
23	Chris Wilczewski	Completed	6:41.77
24	Abel Gonzalez	Completed	6:54.96
25	Noel Reyes	Completed	7:15.95
26	Karsten Williams	Completed	7:26.28
27	Brian Arnold	Completed	8:03.37
28	Ian Dory	Completed	8:11.23
29	Dr. Noah Kaufman	Completed	8:21.61
30	Jon Stewart	Completed	8:58.50
31	Kacy Catanzaro	Completed	8:59.53
32	Michael Eckert	Failed	Spider Climb (3:24.46)
33	Dustin McKinney	Failed	Spider Climb (4:04.89)
34	Sean Morris	Failed	Spider Climb (4:49.51)
35	Luciano Acuna Jr.	Failed	Floating Stairs (2:08.92)
36	Kevin Klein	Failed	Pole Grasper (2:34.96)
37	Tukrong "TK" Klengdong	Failed	Crazy Cliffhanger (2:50.13)
38	James McGrath	Failed	Body Prop (2:52.43)
39	Travis Rosen	Failed	Crazy Cliffhanger (2:53.55)
40	Daniel Larson-Fine	Failed	Doorknob Arch (3:29.52)
41	Justin Kydd	Failed	Doorknob Arch (3:31.02)
42	Dustin Rocho	Failed	Body Prop (3:39.87)
43	David Gilbert	Failed	Pole Grasper (3:41.06)
44	Aaron Himelright	Failed	Crazy Cliffhanger (3:47.26)
45	Karson Voiles	Failed	Doorknob Arch (4:01.21)
46	Yen Chen	Failed	Doorknob Arch (4:02.77)
47	Dan Entmacher	Failed	Doorknob Arch (4:22.18)
48	Robin Pietschmann	Failed	Doorknob Arch (4:32.34)
49	Matthew Wilder	Failed	Doorknob Arch (5:04.46)
50	Joel Brady	Failed	Doorknob Arch (6:32.82)
51	Cass Clawson	Failed	Swinging Frames (1:59.82)
52	Jonathan Sharp Brown	Failed	Minefield (2:11.72)
53	Joseph Rosello	Failed	Minefield (2:25.56)
54	Thaddeus Robeck	Failed	Cannonball Alley (2:26.91)
55	Brandon Pannell	Failed	Swinging Frames (2:26.91)
56	Todd Bourgeois	Failed	Minefield (2:36.47)
57	Alan Connealy	Failed	Cannonball Alley (2:44.24)
58	Andrew Lowes	Failed	Rumbling Dice (2:44.40)
59	Connor Moyer	Failed	Swinging Frames (2:50.81)
60	Lance Pekus	Failed	Arm Rings (2:52.11)
61	Dorian Cedars	Failed	Cannonball Alley (3:23.82)
62	Dan Polizzi	Failed	Rumbling Dice (3:27.02)
63	Vadym Kuvakin	Failed	Cannonball Alley (3:28.04)
64	Matthew Schumann	Failed	Rumbling Dice (3:29.28)
65	Derek Nakamoto	Failed	Cannonball Alley (3:36.27)
66	Alex Kane	Failed	Cannonball Alley (3:36.70)
67	John Vogt	Failed	Minefield (3:39.61)
68	Travis Brewer	Failed	Cannonball Alley (3:41.85)
69	Brian Kretsch	Failed	Cannonball Alley (3:42.00)
70	Kyle Cochran	Failed	Cannonball Alley (4:11.14)
71	Robert Ing	Failed	Cannonball Alley (4:11.95)
72	Ben Melick	Failed	Cannonball Alley (4:17.50)
73	Johnathan Morin	Failed	Swinging Frames (4:21.67)
74	Joseph "Jo Jo" Bynum	Failed	Swinging Frames (4:33.78)
75	Sam Sann	Failed	Swinging Frames (4:43.95)

== Notable achievements ==
Truss builder Stephen France made ANW history when he became the first amputee ever to compete with a prosthetic limb in the qualifying round in Miami. Also, ANW Trainer Drew Drechsel sets the second fastest time in any qualifier with 0:44.24 run, only seconds behind Michael "Frosti" Zernow, who had the fastest time on Season 3 in Venice Qualifying. At 52 years old, Jon Stewart became the oldest person to complete a city finals course. Chris and Brian Wilczewski became the first brothers ever to make it to Mount Midoriyama together.

=== Notable competitors ===
- U.S. Olympic luger Kate Hansen
- 5-time ANW veteran David Campbell
- The Biggest Loser personal trainer Kim Lyons
- former American Gladiator champion and gladiator Evan "Rocket" Dollard
- U.S. Olympic bobsledder Johnny Quinn
- U.S. Olympic gymnast Jonathan Horton
- U.S. Olympic gymnast Terin Humphrey
- 4-time ANW veteran Brent Steffensen
- professional wrestler Matt Capiccioni
- professional wakeboarder Shaun Murray
- retired-MLB baseball player Rich Thompson
- U.S. Olympic luger Preston Griffall
- professional BMX rider Morgan Wade
- professional MMA fighter Michelle Waterson
- U.S. Olympic snowboarder Faye Gulini
- MMA fighter Jason Soares

=== Women's success ===
This season, the women who attempted the Warped Wall (obstacle #6) from last season competed. Three women out of 100 have completed the course. Former NCAA gymnast Kacy Catanzaro made ANW history when she became the first woman to complete the qualifying course, making it up the Warped Wall on her second try at 5:26.18 at the Dallas qualifiers, ranking her 21 out of 30; this also makes her the first woman to make it up the Warped Wall. Catanzaro became the second woman to attempt the finals course and the first to complete it, which she did with a time of 8:59.53, ranking her 7th out of 15. This made her the first woman to advance to Mount Midoriyama in Las Vegas. She failed to complete the 1st round of the finals, in Las Vegas while attempting the Jumping Spider.

Event coordinator Michelle Warnky became the second woman to finish the qualifying course, making it up the Warped Wall on her first try in a faster time (3:08.94) than Catanzaro at the St. Louis qualifiers, ranking her 19th out of 30. She also became the second woman ever to attempt the Salmon Ladder in the finals, coming up just inches short. She did receive a wild-card spot in Las Vegas, but she overshot on her dismount to the landing pad on the Silk Slider.

Rock climbing instructor Meagan Martin became the third woman to finish the course, making it up the Warped Wall on her third and final try at 4:46.29 at the Denver qualifiers, ranking her 22nd out of 30; she also became the first woman in ANW to complete the Devil Steps. However, in the Denver Finals, she came up short and fell at the Spikes into Cargo. She received a wild-card spot in Las Vegas, and became the first American woman to complete the Jumping Spider, but ran out of time on the Warped Wall.

In addition, Melanie Hunt and Courtney Venuti both made it to the Warped Wall in Miami Qualifying, but both of them couldn't get up it and advance. Hunt competed the last 2 seasons, going out on the 2nd obstacle both times and Venuti competed in Season 5. Amy Pajcic also made it to the Warped Wall in the St. Louis Qualifying, but couldn't make it up.

Before Catanzaro, Warnky, and Martin, the only woman to have beaten an American Ninja Warrior or Sasuke stage, trial, or qualifier was former Super Sentai stuntwoman Chie Nishimura (who beat Sasuke Stage 1 in 1998). Not even Kunoichi champions Rie Komiya or Ayako Miyake had managed it.

== Mount Midoriyama ==
=== Stage 1 ===
Competitors in Bold finished the City Finals.

- Piston Road
- Giant Cycle
- Silk Slider
- Jumping Spider
- Half Pipe Attack
- Warped Wall
- Spinning Bridge
- Final Climb

1	**Elet Hall**	Completed	1:18.40
2	Lorin Ball (Wild Card)	Completed	1:29.71
3	**Paul Kasemir**	Completed	1:33.96
4	**Joe Moravsky**	Completed	1:35.21
5	**Ian Dory**	Completed	1:41.19
6	Joshua Cook (Wild Card)	Completed	1:41.29
7	**Chris Wilczewski**	Completed	1:42.74
8	**Abel Gonzalez**	Completed	1:45.92
9	Jo Jo Bynum	Completed	1:47.15
10	Travis Rosen	Completed	1:47.27
11	**Isaac Caldiero**	Completed	1:48.42
12	Andrew Lowes	Completed	1:52.74
13	**Dan Galiczynski**	Completed	1:55.35
14	**Ryan Stratis**	Completed	1:56.34
15	**Dr. Noah Kaufman**	Completed	1:57.02
16	Yen Chen	Completed	2:01.40
17	**Brian Arnold**	Completed	2:03.43
18	**J.J. Woods**	Completed	2:04.73

=== Stage 2 ===
- Rope Jungle
- Double Salmon Ladder
- Unstable Bridge
- Butterfly Wall
- Metal Spin
- Wall Lift

Order #	Finalist	Result	Notes
1	J.J. Woods	2. Double Salmon Ladder	Second level.
2	Brian Arnold	3. Unstable Bridge	Transition to second plank.
3	Yen Chen	4. Butterfly Wall	
4	Dr. Noah Kaufman	3. Unstable Bridge	Transition to second plank.
5	Dan Galiczynski	3. Unstable Bridge	First plank.
6	Ryan Stratis	5. Metal Spin	Slid Down chain just before dismount.
7	Andrew Lowes	5. Metal Spin	Missed landing platform.
8	Isaac Caldiero	2. Double Salmon Ladder	Third level.
9	Travis Rosen	5. Metal Spin	Accidentally let go of platform and got stuck.
10	Joseph "Jo Jo" Bynum	3. Unstable Bridge	Transition to first plank.
11	Abel Gonzalez	2. Double Salmon Ladder	Transition to second side.
12	Chris Wilczewski	5. Metal Spin	Missed landing platform.
13	Joshua Cook (Wild Card)	4. Butterfly Wall	
14	Ian Dory	5. Metal Spin	Failed dismount.
15	Joe Moravsky	Completed (2:03.71)	
16	Paul Kasemir	3. Unstable Bridge	Transition to second plank.
17	Lorin Ball (Wild Card)	2. Double Salmon Ladder	Fifth level.
18	Elet Hall	Completed (1:51.66)	

==== Leaderboard ====
Order #	Finalist	Result
1	Elet Hall	Completed (1:51.66)
2	Joe Moravsky	Completed (2:03.71)

=== Stage 3 ===
Order #	Finalist	Result	Notes
1	Elet Hall	3. Floating Boards	Transition to fourth board.
2	Joe Moravsky	6. Hang Climb	Fell about halfway up.

Note: Moravsky was only the third person in American Ninja Warrior history to complete the Ultimate Cliffhanger.

== Ratings ==
Episode		Air date	Timeslot	Rating/Share (18–49)		Viewers (millions)	Ref.
1	"Venice Beach Qualifying"	May 26, 2014	Monday 9:00 p.m.	1.6	5	4.65	
2	"Dallas Qualifying"	June 2, 2014	Monday 9:00 p.m.	1.9	6	5.30	
3	"St. Louis Qualifying"	June 9, 2014	Monday 9:00 p.m.	1.7	5	4.93	
4	"Miami Qualifying"	June 16, 2014	Monday 9:00 p.m.	1.6	5	4.66	
5	"Denver Qualifying"	June 23, 2014	Monday 9:00 p.m.	1.7	5	5.15	
6	"Venice Beach Finals"	July 7, 2014	Monday 9:00 p.m.	1.7	5	5.29	
7	"Dallas Finals"	July 14, 2014	Monday 9:00 p.m.	1.7	5	5.44	
8	"St. Louis Finals"	July 21, 2014	Monday 9:00 p.m.	1.9	6	5.82	
9	"Miami Finals"	July 28, 2014	Monday 9:00 p.m.	2.0	6	5.73	
10	"Denver Finals"	August 4, 2014	Monday 9:00 p.m.	2.0	6	5.59	
11	"Best Runs of the Season"	August 11, 2014	Monday 9:00 p.m.	1.4	4	4.32	
12	"National Finals Night 1"	August 18, 2014	Monday 9:00 p.m.	1.8	6	5.74	
13	"National Finals Night 2"	September 1, 2014	Monday 9:00 p.m.	1.9	6	5.83	
14	"National Finals Night 3"	September 8, 2014	Monday 9:00 p.m.	1.8	5	5.29	
