= Angela Sun =

American journalist

- Born: October 19, 1979 (age 47); California, U.S.
- Education: University of California, Los Angeles
- Occupations: Sports reporter, documentary filmmaker
- Website: angelasun.com

Angela Sun (born October 19, 1979) is an American journalist, television presenter, sportscaster, and documentary filmmaker.

== Early life and education ==
Sun was born in Santa Clara County, California. She graduated from Monta Vista High School in Cupertino, California and later earned degrees in Sociology and Communications from the University of California at Los Angeles. Throughout high school and college, Sun competed in various pro-am surf events and was a team rider for Loaded Boards. She gained sponsorship recognition from major brands such as Roxy, Reef, Oakley, Billabong, Rip Curl, and Vans. Following her surfing career, she became an actress, film director, sports caster, investigative journalist, and avid adventure traveler.

== Career ==
=== TV hosting ===
Sun's action sports background led to hosting for EXTV, LG Action Sports Championships and ASP Surfing World Tour. In 2003, Sun was hired as a correspondent for Fox Sports Net's 54321. She went on to report for FSN West's Dig! Volleyball Magazine show.

In 2008, Sun joined the luxury lifestyle news magazine First Look], airing nationally on NBC. In 2011, she was nominated for an Emmy award for her work on 1st Look. In addition to LXTV, Sun hosted the show InnerView as well as MTV Iggy on the newly launched global channel of MTV networks.

In 2009, Sun became an anchor for The Court Report on the Tennis Channel. Beginning in 2010, she hosted The Yahoo Sports Minute, which she took over from former host Ashley Russell, and covered the 2010 Winter Olympics in Vancouver for Yahoo! Sports. Sun joined co-hosts Matt Iseman and Olympic Gold medalist Jonny Moseley for the fourth season of American Ninja Warrior on G4TV and NBC in the summer of 2012. On July 18, 2014, Sun hosted The Yahoo Sports Minute for the final time. After that there was a final message for her, "Editor’s Note: 'The Yahoo Sports team would like to cordially thank Angela Sun for hosting the Yahoo Sports Minute for the last four and a half years. Thanks for helping make the Yahoo Sports Minute the #1 online sports show, Sunny Angela.'" She was the first Asian American female on-camera personality to appear on ESPN, Fox Sports, Tennis Channel, and Yahoo! Sports.

=== Acting work ===
Sun appears opposite Academy Award winner Forest Whitaker in the 2008 film Street Kings.

=== Writing ===
Sun has been a contributing travel writer for wandermelon.com.

=== Directing and producing ===
Sun directed and produced her first feature-length documentary, Plastic Paradise: The Great Pacific Garbage Patch, examining the plastic pollution in the oceans and its effects on the environment, marine life, and ultimately humans. The Great Pacific Garbage Patch is a huge collection of trash trapped in a gyre in the Pacific Ocean.

== Personal life ==
Sun speaks English, Spanish, and some German and Mandarin. She has traveled to over 40 countries and studied abroad in Australia at the University of New South Wales.

In an Instagram post on 20 March 2020, she confirmed that she had contracted COVID-19.
