= Evan Dollard =

American athlete and rock climber

Personal information
- Nickname: The Rocket
- Born: April 7, 1982 (age 44) Chicago, Illinois, U.S.

Evan "The Rocket" Dollard (born April 7, 1982) is an American athlete and rock climber. He came to prominence during Season 1 of the rebooted American Gladiators, as the season 1 men's champion. He earned his nickname "Rocket" from his speed in Gladiator competition, taking it as his gladiator name, becoming a Gladiator for season 2 of the rebooted American Gladiators. He has since appeared prominently in the Ninja Warrior franchise; in American Ninja Warrior (and hence US TV specials for Sasuke called "Ninja Warrior") and the standalone American Ninja Warrior, also using his nickname. Dollard also hosts his own web series, "Ninja Quickies". He has also competed in local editions of Ninja Warrior.

== Biography ==
Before coming to fame, Dollard worked as a youth instructor, and taught rock climbing.

Dollard was a childhood fan of the original American Gladiators (AG). He discovered that AG had been rebooted through his roommate finding the audition request on the internet. After discovering that AG was making a comeback, decided to try out for season 1 of the new show. He eventually became season 1 men's champion, and went on to be optioned for being a Gladiator for season 2, as "Rocket". Dollard discovered that AG had been canceled when an AG coworker mentioned that set equipment had been sold off, he had not been contacted by producers about the fate of season 3.

Dollard found out about American Ninja Warrior (ANW) through co-worker computer programmers, who showed him YouTube videos of SASUKE and American Ninja Challenge, and suggested he try. Dollard contacted G4 TV to apply for a spot on American Ninja Warrior, and submitted a tape of his performances on American Gladiators as his audition tape. He was selected, and on ANW season 2, made it through and obtained a trip to Japan to Mount Midoriyama.

Dollard was part of ANW for G4 in season 5 by being host of Well Trained Warrior web series web extras to ANW. The series interviewed ANW competitors at CrossFit Beach, and showed their training.

Dollard became involved in A. Smith & Co.'s mid-2010s attempt to restart AG, which was not picked up by any network. With that show's failure to launch, Dollard started "Ninja Quickies" on YouTube. Ninja Quickies is and expansion on the premise of earlier series "Well Trained Warrior", interviewing ANW competitors on their own training grounds.

With Dollard's experiences on ANW and AG, he was asked to host BattleFrog for 2015, and be an analyst, analyzing the obstacles and strategies to overcome them.

In 2017, Dollard joined the WolfPack Ninja Tour, a touring exhibition show of NinjaWarrior/Sasuke-style obstacles.

In the 2020s, Dollard has been an iFit fitness trainer for NordicTrack.

== Competitions ==
- 2008 American Gladiators season 1 - competitor - men's champion
- 2008 American Gladiators season 2 - Gladiator "Rocket"
- 2010 American Ninja Warrior season 2
  - 2010 Sasuke season 26
- 2011 American Ninja Warrior season 3
- 2012 American Ninja Warrior season 4
- 2012 Southwest Regional American Ninja Warrior - regional champion
- 2014 American Ninja Warrior season 6
- 2015 American Ninja Warrior season 7
- 2015 Rockford Ninja Warrior
- 2015 X Warrior (Chinese: 极限勇士; pinyin: Jíxiàn Yǒngshì; lit. Ultimate Warrior) China vs USA all-star game (Jiangsu TV; 江苏卫视)
- 2016 Team Ninja Warrior season 1 - member of Brent Steffensen's Team Alpha
- 2016 American Ninja Warrior season 8

== Filmography ==
- 2008 American Gladiators season 2 - Gladiator "The Rocket"
- 2013 Well-Trained Warrior host
- 2014-onwards Ninja Quickies host
- 2015 BattleFrog College Championship season 1 - co-host
- 2016 Spartan: Ultimate Team Challenge season 1 - trackside reporter
- 2016- Spartan Strong host
