= American Ninja Warrior season 2 =

Season of American reality/sport competition television series American Ninja Warrior

American Ninja Warrior
- Season 2
- Hosted by: Matt Iseman; Jimmy Smith; Alison Haislip
- No. of contestants: 400
- No. of episodes: 10

Release
- Original network: G4
- Original release: December 8, 2010 – January 2, 2011

Season chronology
- ← Previous; Season 1 Next → Season 3

The second season of American Ninja Warrior began on December 8, 2010, in Venice Beach, California where 300 competitors took on the course. The 15 semi-finalists moved on to the "Ninja Warrior Boot Camp" in the remote California mountains, where they competed in a series of team challenges. Then, the final moved on to compete in the season finale of American Ninja Warrior 2 as a part of Sasuke 26 at Mount Midoriyama in Japan. The series concluded on January 2, 2011, same as Sasuke 26 was aired in Japan. This season was hosted by Matt Iseman and Jimmy Smith, with G4's Alison Haislip as a sideline reporter.

== Notable Competitors ==
Notable competitors this season included:

- Professional freerunner Levi Meeuwenberg
- Professional freerunner Brent Steffensen
- Former American Gladiator champion and gladiator Evan Dollard
- Former Survivor contestant Ozzy Lusth
- Dutch canoe polo pioneer Nick Duett

== Ninja Boot Camp ==
The 15 competitors who completed the Venice Beach finals course headed to "Ninja Warrior Boot Camp" where they were broken down into three teams: Red Dragons, White Tigers, and Blue Monkeys. From then on, 5 were eliminated from competition and 10 moved onto Mount Midoriyama in Japan to compete in the season finale for a chance to win $250,000 and be the first "American Ninja Warrior".

The 10 finalists earned the chance to compete at Sasuke 26 which aired on January 2, 2011, on G4.

Final 10: In order they received their American flag "colors" (bandanas):

Red Dragons:

Order #	Competitor
1	Brent Steffensen
2	Travis Furlanic
3	Paul Kasemir
4	David Campbell

White Tigers:

Order #	Competitor
1	Shane Daniels
2	Levi Meeuwenberg

Blue Monkeys:

Order #	Competitor
1	Brian Orosco
2	Patrick Cusic
3	Adam Truesdell
4	Evan Dollard

== Mount Midoriyama ==
None of the competitors were able to complete stage 3, but half (5 out of 10) completed stage 1 and progressed onto stage 2, where 4 out of 5 made it onto stage 3.

=== Stage 1 ===
Order #	Finalist	Result	Notes
1 #59	Adam Laplante *	5. Half-Pipe Attack	
2 #60	Patrick Cusic	3. Rolling Escargot	
3 #61	Paul Kasemir	Clear (2:09.16)	
4 #72	Adam Truesdell	7. Giant Swing	
5 #73	Evan Dollard	3. Rolling Escargot	
6 #74	Brent Steffensen	Clear (2:01.79)	
7 #77	Travis Furlanic	Clear (1:55.77)	
8 #83	Shane Daniels	8. Final Climb	Time Out
9 #84	David Campbell	Clear (1:48.49)	
10 #92	Brian Orosco	Clear (1:49.44)	

* alternate, replaced Levi Meeuwenberg who broke his wrist during a taping of Jump City: Seattle

=== Stage 2 ===
Order #	Finalist	Result	Notes
1	Paul Kasemir	Clear (1:32.43)	
2	Brent Steffensen	Clear (1:13.36)	
3	Travis Furlanic	4. Balance Tank	Fell at beginning.
4	David Campbell	Clear (1:11.57)	
5	Brian Orosco	Clear (1:29.24)	

=== Stage 3 ===
Order #	Finalist	Result	Notes
1	Paul Kasemir	2. Doorknob Grasper	Transition to third doorknob.
2	Brent Steffensen	4. Ultimate Cliffhanger	Third ledge.
3	David Campbell	4. Ultimate Cliffhanger	Transition to fourth ledge. Best performance of the season.
4	Brian Orosco	1. Roulette Cylinder	Lost grip at end of track.
