= American Ninja Warrior season 16 =

Season of American reality/sport competition television series American Ninja Warrior

American Ninja Warrior
- Season 16
- Hosted by: Matt Iseman; Akbar Gbaja-Biamila; Zuri Hall
- Finals venue: Mount Midoriyama (Las Vegas Strip)
- No. of episodes: 11

Release
- Original network: NBC
- Original release: June 3 – September 9, 2024

Season chronology
- ← Previous; Season 15 Next → Season 17

The sixteenth season of American Ninja Warrior premiered on June 3, 2024, on NBC. A spin-off from the Japanese reality series Sasuke, it is hosted by Matt Iseman, Akbar Gbaja-Biamila, and Zuri Hall.

For the first time ever, a competitor became the first two-time grand prize winner and consecutively in Vance Walker, who became the first ninja to achieve "Total Victory" twice. In the same season, Caleb Bergstrom became the sixth recorded ninja to achieve total victory, but completed the rope climb just over a second slower than Walker.

The season was officially announced by NBC in late March 2023, though the applications were being accepted from November 19, 2022, until December 16, 2022. The full list of competitors was published on March 15, 2023. Filming for qualifiers moved to Los Angeles, California, where the semifinals remained. Filming for national finals remained in Las Vegas, Nevada.

Filming for the season began on March 15, 2023, and wrapped in early May 2023.

== Obstacles ==
=== Qualifying ===
Like in season 15, the qualifying course starts with the Pole Vault and ends with the Warped Wall, with an attempt at the 18.5-foot Mega Wall available for anyone who finishes the course in under 1 minute and 20 seconds; the instant reward for successfully completing the Mega Wall, once again sponsored by Wells Fargo, was doubled to $20,000 this season. The Runoffs also returned; like in the previous season, the bottom two male contestants and two female contestants on the leaderboard (12th and 13th places) would race side-by-side on the four-obstacle course with the winners earning the last spot in the semifinals.

Denotes obstacles created by fans for the Obstacle Design Challenge.

Event	Obstacles						Finish under 1:20
Course 1	Pole Vault	Reel to Reel	Dangerous Waters	Duck Duck Goose	Jawbreakers	Warped Wall	Mega Wall
Course 2	Pole Vault	Double Twister	Dangerous Waters	Duck Duck Goose	Ring the Bells	Warped Wall	Mega Wall
Course 3	Pole Vault	Ring Chaser	Spinning Bridge	Heavy Metal	The Cubes	Warped Wall	Mega Wall
Course 4	Pole Vault	Reel to Reel	Spinning Bridge	Heavy Metal	Jawbreakers	Warped Wall	Mega Wall
Course 5	Pole Vault	Ring Chaser	Spinning Bridge	Heavy Metal	The Cubes	Warped Wall	Mega Wall
Course 6	Pole Vault	Reel to Reel	Spinning Bridge	Heavy Metal	Jawbreakers	Warped Wall	Mega Wall
Course 7	Pole Vault	Reel to Reel	Dangerous Waters	Duck Duck Goose	Jawbreakers	Warped Wall	Mega Wall
Course 8	Pole Vault	Double Twister	Dangerous Waters	Duck Duck Goose	Ring the Bells	Warped Wall	Mega Wall

==== Runoffs ====
Event	Obstacles			
Course 1	Home Run	Spring Forward	Wingnuts	Hopscotch
Course 2	Home Run	Spring Forward	Wingnuts	Hopscotch
Course 3	Home Run	Flying Shelf Grab	Wingnuts	Sideways
Course 4	Home Run	Flying Shelf Grab	Wingnuts	Sideways
Course 5	Home Run	Flying Shelf Grab	Wingnuts	Sideways
Course 6	Home Run	Flying Shelf Grab	Wingnuts	Sideways
Course 7	Home Run	Spring Forward	Wingnuts	Hopscotch
Course 8	Home Run	Spring Forward	Wingnuts	Hopscotch

=== Semifinals ===
Event	Obstacles					
Course 1	Home Run	Flying Shelf Grab	Wingnuts	Sideways	Spin Hopper	Rope Climb
Course 2	Home Run	Flying Shelf Grab	Wingnuts	Sideways	Spin Hopper	Rope Climb
Course 3	Home Run	Spring Forward	Wingnuts	Hopscotch	Spin Hopper	Rope Climb
Course 4	Home Run	Spring Forward	Wingnuts	Hopscotch	Spin Hopper	Rope Climb

=== National Finals ===
Stage	Obstacles									Time Limit
Stage 1	Slide Surfer	Barrel Roll	Giant Rollercoaster	Jumping Spider	The Gambler	Warped Wall	Dipping Birds	Thread the Needle	Cargo Net	2:10
Stage 2	Striding Steps	Double Salmon Ladder	Jawbreakers	Swing Surfer	Epic Air Surfer	Falling Shelves				4:00
Stage 3	Patriot Pass	Stalactites	Slam Dunk	Ultimate Cliffhanger	Pizza Party	Pressure Cooker	Road Signs			N/A
Stage 4	Rope Climb									:30

== Qualifying ==
The eight qualifiers, divided into five nights, took place on the lot of Universal Studios Hollywood in Los Angeles, California. Like Season 15, the number of semifinalists remained at 16, and men and women have completely separate leaderboards. The top 11 men and top 3 women advance to the semifinals immediately, while the next two men (12th/13th place) and the next two women (4th/5th place) compete head-to-head in "The Runoffs" for the final spots.

Denotes expanded course (Mega Wall) finishes
Denotes runoff winners who advanced to semifinals
Denotes rookie contestants

=== Course 1 ===
Three new obstacles were introduced in the qualifying course: Reel to Reel, Dangerous Waters, and Duck Duck Goose (an Obstacle Design Challenge creation).

Top 13 Men
Rank	Competitor	Time	Furthest Obstacle
1	Jonah Brown	01:15.16	Finished
2	Daniel Gil	01:17.16	Finished
3	Isaiah Thomas	01:19.60	Finished
4	Jody Avila	01:34.14	Finished
5	Grant Kiningham	01:48.13	Finished
6	Kyle Schulze	01:55.97	Finished
7	Jonah Maningo	01:04.21	Jawbreakers
8	Anthony Porter	01:11.29	Jawbreakers
9	Jesus Capote	01:22.22	Jawbreakers
10	Dillon Ruble	01:30.84	Jawbreakers
11	Sam Folsom	00:15.02	Duck Duck Goose
12	Caiden Madzelan	00:18.99	Duck Duck Goose
13	Jonas Harmer	00:48.05	Duck Duck Goose

Top 5 Women
Rank	Competitor	Time	Furthest Obstacle
1	Isabella Wakeham	02:19.59	Finished
2	Madelyn Madaras	01:47.35	Jawbreakers
3	Karen Wiltin	01:24.42	Duck Duck Goose
4	Liv Hackmann	—N/a	Duck Duck Goose
5	Ixchel Valentino	—N/a	Dangerous Waters

=== Course 2 ===
Top 13 Men
Rank	Competitor	Time	Furthest Obstacle
1	Caleb Bergstrom	01:05.17	Finished + Mega Wall
2	Nacssa Garemore	01:15.12	Finished
3	Flip Rodriguez	01:18.14	Finished
4	Owen Dyer	01:25.80	Finished
5	Alex Nye	01:56.30	Finished
6	Benjamin Drake	02:07.16	Finished
7	Lance Pekus	01:03.70	Ring the Bells
8	Kyle McCreight	01:06.83	Ring the Bells
9	Branden McWilliams	01:08.21	Ring the Bells
10	Steven Cen	01:24.64	Ring the Bells
11	Lenny Lopez	01:29.07	Ring the Bells
12	Elijah Browning	00:20.57	Duck Duck Goose
13	Roberto Garemore	00:21.83	Duck Duck Goose

Top 5 Women
Rank	Competitor	Time	Furthest Obstacle
1	Anna McArthur	01:35.66	Ring the Bells
2	Jenn Sanders	02:21.08	Ring the Bells
3	Zhanique Lovett	00:44.33	Duck Duck Goose
4	Lisa Hair	01:12.69	Duck Duck Goose
5	Nikki Zink	—N/a	Duck Duck Goose

=== Course 3 ===
This course introduced one new obstacle, Heavy Metal.

Top 13 Men
Rank	Competitor	Time	Furthest Obstacle
1	Levi Enright	01:11.75	Finished
2	Kaden Lebsack	01:20.30	Finished
3	Chris Behrends	01:28.68	Finished
4	Ben Behrends	02:08.51	Finished
5	Cam Baumgartner	02:11.63	Finished
6	Max Feinberg	02:13.12	Finished
7	Nathan Green	02:40.85	Finished
8	Scott Behrends	01:00.84	The Cubes
9	Glenn Albright	01:16.85	The Cubes
10	Eric Middleton	01:19.70	The Cubes
11	Marquez Green	01:27.22	The Cubes
12	Seth Lambert	00:27.61	Heavy Metal
13	Tyler Yamauchi	00:31.97	Heavy Metal

Top 5 Women
Rank	Competitor	Time	Furthest Obstacle
1	Emily Keener	01:16.74	The Cubes
2	Mady Howard	01:39.16	The Cubes
3	Annabella Heinrichs	00:51.11	Heavy Metal
4	Violet Kepo'o	00:37.50	Spinning Bridge
5	Rysann Clark	—N/a	Spinning Bridge

=== Course 4 ===
Top 13 Men
Rank	Competitor	Time	Furthest Obstacle
1	Matt Bradley	01:00.16	Finished
2	Noah Meunier	01:04.81	Finished
3	Jay Lewis	01:05.22	Finished
4	Sean Bryan	01:07.36	Finished
5	Ramcis Valdez	01:23.48	Finished
6	Jacob Arnstein	01:31.26	Finished
7	Najee Richardson	01:34.83	Finished
8	Noah Buschur	01:50.25	Finished
9	Brandon Singletary	02:06.17	Finished
10	David Campbell	00:50.61	Jawbreakers
11	John Uga	01:07.95	Jawbreakers
12	Ben Kooper	01:28.45	Jawbreakers
13	Guang Cui	01:50.05	Jawbreakers

Top 5 Women
Rank	Competitor	Time	Furthest Obstacle
1	Casey Rothschild	—N/a	Heavy Metal
2	Taylor Johnson	—N/a	Heavy Metal
3	Addy Herman	—N/a	Heavy Metal
4	Elly Hart	—N/a	Spinning Bridge
5	Jojo Grubesic	—N/a	Spinning Bridge

=== Course 5 ===
Top 13 Men
Rank	Competitor	Time	Furthest Obstacle
1	Kai Beckstrand	01:06.03	Finished + Mega Wall
2	Jackson Twait	01:19.67	Finished
3	Austin Gray	01:29.89	Finished
4	Donovan Metoyer	01:52.34	Finished
5	Luke Beckstrand	02:11.38	Finished
6	Mike Silenzi	02:31.11	Finished
7	David Tomassoni	02:58.99	Finished
8	Ethan Gardulski	03:09.60	Finished
9	Drew Nester	03:11.76	Finished
10	Colton Skuster	00:50.22	The Cubes
11	Barry Boyd	01:08.66	The Cubes
12	Branden Varner	01:25.04	The Cubes
13	Jesse Maurer	01:58.26	The Cubes

Top 5 Women
Rank	Competitor	Time	Furthest Obstacle
1	Taylor Greene	02:56.34	Finished
2	Riley Porter	01:30.12	The Cubes
3	Jaelyn Bennett	01:47.87	The Cubes
4	Judith Carroll	—N/a	The Cubes
5	Holly Beckstrand	—N/a	The Cubes

=== Course 6 ===
Top 13 Men
Rank	Competitor	Time	Furthest Obstacle
1	Josiah Pippel	01:02.15	Finished
2	Joe Moravsky	01:06.53	Finished
3	Kevin Rodriguez	01:07.51	Finished
4	James Sannella	01:15.78	Finished
5	Joe Meissner	01:18.15	Finished
6	Xavier Dantzler	01:34.07	Finished
7	James McGrath	03:22.27	Finished
8	Gavin Obey	00:38.37	Jawbreakers
9	Verdale Benson	00:40.58	Jawbreakers
10	David Fleming	01:03.19	Jawbreakers
11	Jamie Rahn	01:05.49	Jawbreakers
12	Vincent Pane	01:14.52	Jawbreakers
13	Jesse Orenshein	02:04.14	Jawbreakers

Top 5 Women
Rank	Competitor	Time	Furthest Obstacle
1	Abby Clark	02:57.47	Finished
2	Brittney Durant	00:34.71	Heavy Metal
3	Emily Gardiner	00:51.58	Heavy Metal
4	Sydney Yee	00:52.11	Heavy Metal
5	Sasha Moore	—N/a	Heavy Metal

=== Course 7 ===
Top 13 Men
Rank	Competitor	Time	Furthest Obstacle
1	Vance Walker	01:21.83	Finished
2	Kyle Soderman	01:23.42	Finished
3	Karsten Williams	01:38.44	Finished
4	Josh Miller	01:46.64	Finished
5	Josh Salinas	00:40.33	Jawbreakers
6	Karson Voiles	01:14.72	Jawbreakers
7	John Mack	00:20.96	Duck Duck Goose
8	Nick Hanson	00:38.37	Duck Duck Goose
9	Francisco Barajas	00:27.49	Duck Duck Goose
10	Brigham Youngstrom	00:27.83	Duck Duck Goose
11	Arnold Hernandez	00:38.54	Duck Duck Goose
12	Ricky Vu	00:46.32	Duck Duck Goose
13	Michael Eckert	—N/a	Duck Duck Goose

Top 5 Women
Rank	Competitor	Time	Furthest Obstacle
1	Karen Potts	—N/a	Jawbreakers
2	Chynna Hart	—N/a	Duck Duck Goose
3	Megan Johnson	—N/a	Duck Duck Goose
4	Rachel Brown	—N/a	Duck Duck Goose
5	Ally Tippetts Wooton	—N/a	Dangerous Waters

=== Course 8 ===
Top 13 Men
Rank	Competitor	Time	Furthest Obstacle
1	Enzo DeFerrari Wilson	01:10.24	Finished
2	David Bergstrom-Wright	01:17.79	Finished
3	Conor Galvin	01:47.35	Finished
4	Julius Ferguson	00:38.59	Ring the Bells
5	Vinnie Castranova	00:45.73	Ring the Bells
6	R.J. Roman	00:46.78	Ring the Bells
7	Bob Reese	00:46.92	Ring the Bells
8	Josiah Singleton	00:59.65	Ring the Bells
9	Jeff Loftus	01:07.82	Ring the Bells
10	Ryan Stratis	01:26.06	Ring the Bells
11	Jay Flores	01:27.44	Ring the Bells
12	Cal Plohoros	00:26.37	Duck Duck Goose
13	Josh Wagg	00:29.82	Duck Duck Goose

Top 5 Women
Rank	Competitor	Time	Furthest Obstacle
1	Jessie Graff	02:42:03	Finished
2	Jaleesa Himka	—N/a	Ring the Bells
3	Megan Budway	—N/a	Dangerous Waters
4	Caitlyn Bergstrom-Wright	—N/a	Dangerous Waters
5	Emma Pereyra	—N/a	Dangerous Waters

== Semifinals ==
Rounds formed
Semifinal	Qualifying
1	3 & 5
2	4 & 6
3	1 & 7
4	2 & 8

The four semifinal rounds, divided over two nights, were taped at the same Universal Studios lot where the qualifiers were filmed during two nights. This season was the second under the new format which was introduced in Season 15 in which the semifinals have competitors race head-to-head in pairs. They are seeded based on the overall results in the leaderboard table which is created by merging two leaderboards from qualifying courses with the same obstacles. During the races, all the winners and the two losers who reached the farthest obstacle in the least amount of time advanced to the National Finals, unless more than two race losers finished the semi-final course, in that case they all advance to the next round. Meanwhile, the two fastest winners proceed to a modified head-to-head course at the end of each night where they race for a Safety Pass, an option for a second attempt on Stage 1 of the finals.

Denotes losers also advancing to National Finals
Denotes Safety Pass winners runs
Denotes rookie contestants

=== Semifinal 1 ===
Men's race results
Winners			Losers		
Time	Result	Competitor	Competitor	Result	Time
0:36.07	7. Completed	Kai Beckstrand	Jesse Maurer	5. Spin Hopper	No result
0:50.70	7. Completed	Kaden Lebsack	Eric Middleton	7. Completed	1:54:56
0:58.40	7. Completed	Colton Skuster	Ben Behrends	7. Completed	1:21.03
1:10.27	7. Completed	Levi Enright	Tyler Yamauchi	5. Spin Hopper	No result
1:16.50	7. Completed	Austin Gray	Barry Boyd	7. Completed	1:28.67
1:18.85	7. Completed	Chris Behrends	Glenn Albright	4. Sideways	No result
1:31.50	7. Completed	David Tomassoni	Mike Silenzi	5. Spin Hopper	No result
1:32.59	7. Completed	Donovan Metoyer	Scott Behrends	5. Spin Hopper	No result
1:35.23	7. Completed	Max Feinberg	Ethan Gardulski	5. Spin Hopper	No result
1:46.17	7. Completed	Jackson Twait	Marquez Green	5. Spin Hopper	No result
1:50.58	7. Completed	Cam Baumgartner	Nathan Green	4. Sideways	No result
0:36.55	5. Spin Hopper	Luke Beckstrand	Drew Nester	4. Sideways	No result

Women's race results
Winners			Losers		
Time	Result	Competitor	Competitor	Result	Time
1:06.27	5. Spin Hopper	Emily Keener	Violet Kepo'o	5. Spin Hopper	No result
1:08.87	5. Spin Hopper	Taylor Greene	Judith Carroll	5. Spin Hopper	No result
1:10.59	5. Spin Hopper	Mady Howard	Jaelyn Bennett	4. Sideways	No result
1:12.20	5. Spin Hopper	Anabella Heinrichs	Riley Porter	4. Sideways	No result

=== Semifinal 2 ===
NOTE: This round's Safety Pass winner, Jay Lewis, was unable to compete in the National Finals due to an injury sustained prior to the event. He was replaced in the National Finals by one of the race losers, James Sannella.

Men's race results
Winners			Losers		
Time	Result	Competitor	Competitor	Result	Time
0:55.23	7. Completed	Jay Lewis	Jamie Rahn	5. Spin Hopper	No result
0:55.76	7. Completed	Gavin Obey	James Sannella	5. Spin Hopper	No result
1:06.55	7. Completed	Joe Moravsky	David Fleming	3. Wingnuts	No result
1:06.58	7. Completed	Matt Bradley	Vincent Pane	6. Rope Climb	2:30.00
1:07.06	7. Completed	Noah Meunier	John Uga	4. Sideways	No result
1:07.38	7. Completed	Josiah Pippel	Guang Cui	5. Spin Hopper	No result
1:24.18	7. Completed	Jacob Arnstein	Noah Buschur	4. Sideways	No result
1:24.80	7. Completed	Sean Bryan	David Campbell	5. Spin Hopper	No result
1:31.07	7. Completed	Joe Meissner	James McGrath	7. Completed	1:51.27
2:13.63	7. Completed	Xavier Dantzler	Najee Richardson	5. Spin Hopper	No result
0:39.60	5. Spin Hopper	Kevin Rodriguez	Verdale Benson	4. Sideways	No result
0:40.07	5. Spin Hopper	Brandon Singletary	Ramcis Valdez	4. Sideways	No result

Women's race results
Winners			Losers		
Time	Result	Competitor	Competitor	Result	Time
2:23.32	7. Completed	Addy Herman	Brittney Durant	4. Sideways	No result
1:11.65	5. Spin Hopper	Abby Clark	Jojo Grubesic	2. Flying Shelf Grab	No result
0:32.29	4. Sideways	Sydney Yee	Casey Rothschild	4. Sideways	No result
0:38.08	4. Sideways	Taylor Johnson	Emily Gardiner	4. Sideways	No result

=== Semifinal 3 ===
Men's race results
Winners			Losers		
Time	Result	Competitor	Competitor	Result	Time
0:52.29	7. Completed	Sam Folsom	Jody Avila	7. Completed	0:57.24
0:53.21	7. Completed	John Mack	Josh Miller	7. Completed	0:53.28
0:56.00	7. Completed	Isaiah Thomas	Arnold Hernandez	4. Hopscotch	No result
0:56.92	7. Completed	Josh Salinas	Karson Voiles	5. Spin Hopper	No result
0:57.24	7. Completed	Vance Walker	Brigham Youngstrom	5. Spin Hopper	No result
1:08.86	7. Completed	Daniel Gil	Ricky Vu	4. Hopscotch	No result
1:14.71	7. Completed	Jonah Maningo	Anthony Porter	5. Spin Hopper	No result
1:20.29	7. Completed	Jonah Brown	Jonas Harmer	3. Wingnuts	No result
1:43.26	7. Completed	Grant Kiningham	Dillon Ruble	4. Hopscotch	No result
2:32.70	7. Completed	Kyle Schulze	Jesus Capote	3. Wingnuts	No result
2:55.96	7. Completed	Nick Hanson	Karsten Williams	3. Wingnuts	No result
0:40.77	5. Spin Hopper	Kyle Soderman	Francisco Barajas	5. Spin Hopper	No result

Women's race results
Winners			Losers		
Time	Result	Competitor	Competitor	Result	Time
2:53.75	7. Completed	Madelyn Madaras	Karen Wiltin	5. Spin Hopper	No result
1:21.56	5. Spin Hopper	Karen Potts	Ally Tippetts Wootton	4. Hopscotch	No result
2:17.11	5. Spin Hopper	Ixchel Valentino	Isabella Wakeham	4. Hopscotch	No result
0:22.59	3. Wingnuts	Megan Johnson	Chynna Hart	3. Wingnuts	No result

=== Semifinal 4 ===
Men's race results
Winners			Losers		
Time	Result	Competitor	Competitor	Result	Time
0:53.16	7. Completed	Nacssa Garemore	Elijah Browning	7. Completed	0:57.70
0:54.19	7. Completed	Caleb Bergstrom	Cal Plohoros	7. Completed	1:15.72
0:58.86	7. Completed	R.J. Roman	Bob Reese	5. Spin Hopper	No result
1:10.69	7. Completed	Enzo DeFerrari Wilson	Lenny Lopez	3. Wingnuts	No result
1:24.74	7. Completed	David Bergstrom-Wright	Jay Flores	1. Home Run	No result
1:31.41	7. Completed	Conor Galvin	Jeff Loftus	4. Hopscotch	No result
1:37.12	7. Completed	Flip Rodriguez	Ryan Stratis	7. Completed	2:47.83
2:02.72	7. Completed	Benjamin Drake	Kyle McCreight	2. Spring Forward	No result
2:25.33	7. Completed	Owen Dyer	Steven Cen	5. Spin Hopper	No result
0:44:82	5. Spin Hopper	Vinnie Castranova	Josiah Singleton	3. Wingnuts	No result
0:57:87	5. Spin Hopper	Alex Nye	Branden McWilliams	4. Hopscotch	No result
0:26:46	4. Hopscotch	Julius Ferguson	Lance Pekus	4. Hopscotch	No result

Women's race results
Winners			Losers		
Time	Result	Competitor	Competitor	Result	Time
1:00:69	5. Spin Hopper	Caitlyn Bergstrom-Wright	Jaleesa Himka	5. Spin Hopper	No result
1:14:82	5. Spin Hopper	Anna McArthur	Megan Budway	3. Wingnuts	No result
2:09:71	5. Spin Hopper	Jennifer Sanders	Zhanique Lovett	3. Wingnuts	No result
0:17:90	3. Wingnuts	Jessie Graff	Lisa Hair	1. Home Run	No result

== National Finals ==
Once again, the National Finals took place along the Las Vegas Strip.

=== Stage 1 ===
Stage 1 was again spread out over two nights and like before, contestants had 2 minutes and 50 seconds to complete it in order to advance to stage 2. The Barrel Roll, which was previously used in season 13 as well as in two Women's Championships, made its stage 1 debut as the second obstacle.

In addition to those who qualified, two ANW veterans, Ryan Stratis and Jesse "Flex" Labreck, also got to compete via "legacy invites", the former having finished the semi-final course, though neither managed to clear Stage 1. Also, Najee Richardson, who got an invite to run in the National Finals despite losing his race in the semi-finals, failed Stage 1 in what was ultimately his final competition before retiring.

Denotes competitor who used the Safety Pass after failing on his first run.

Top 26 Competitors
Rank	Competitor	Time	Furthest Obstacle
1	Noah Meunier	1:53.09	Completed
2	Kaden Lebsack	1:53.43	Completed
3	Josiah Pippel	1:55.14	Completed
4	Austin Gray	1:58.32	Completed
5	Caleb Bergstrom	2:00.22	Completed
6	Jackson Twait	2:03.07	Completed
7	Kai Beckstrand	2:06.92	Completed
8	Kyle Soderman	2:11.59	Completed
9	Vance Walker	2:15.39	Completed
10	Joe Moravsky	2:16.99	Completed
11	Nacssa Garemore	2:20.99	Completed
12	Isaiah Thomas	2:24.21	Completed
13	Colton Skuster	2:25.84	Completed
14	Daniel Gil	2:28.10	Completed
15	Elijah Browning	2:28.52	Completed
16	Luke Beckstrand	2:29.04	Completed
17	Kevin Rodriguez	2:32.63	Completed
18	Flip Rodriguez	2:35.21	Completed
19	John Mack	2:39.89	Completed
20	Sean Bryan	2:39.92	Completed
21	Cal Plohoros	2:42.07	Completed
22	Max Feinberg	2:42.16	Completed
23	James McGrath	2:44.99	Completed
24	Cam Baumgartner	2:46.41	Completed
25	Sam Folsom	2:47.49	Completed
26	Joe Meissner	2:49.26	Completed

=== Stage 2 ===
Stage 2 retained its format from the previous season, consisting of head-to-head races with the winners, as well as the two top losers who win their runoff races, all advancing to Stage 3. Seven non-winners all also completed Stage 2, thus only the four fastest of them advanced to the runoffs.

Denotes the fastest non-winners who advanced to the runoffs.

Race results
Winners		Losers	
Result	Competitor	Competitor	Result
Completed	Kai Beckstrand	Sean Bryan	Completed
Completed	Nacssa Garemore	Luke Beckstrand	Epic Air Surfer
Completed	Elijah Browning	Isaiah Thomas	Epic Air Surfer
Completed	Noah Meunier	Joe Meissner	Jawbreakers
Completed	Cal Plohoros	Jackson Twait	Completed
Completed	Daniel Gil	Colton Skuster	Completed
Completed	Austin Gray	James McGrath	Completed
Completed	Joe Moravsky	Kevin Rodriguez	Striding Steps
Completed	Caleb Bergstrom	Max Feinberg	Completed
Completed	Sam Folsom	Kaden Lebsack	Jawbreakers
Completed	Josiah Pippel	Cam Baumgartner	Completed
Completed	Vance Walker	Flip Rodriguez	Completed
Falling Shelves	Kyle Soderman	John Mack	Jawbreakers
Non-winner Runoffs
Completed	Jackson Twait	Max Feinberg	Falling Shelves
Completed	Sean Bryan	James McGrath	Falling Shelves

=== Stage 3 ===
As with all previous seasons, only those competitors who clear Stage 3 will advance to the final stage tower. One new obstacle was introduced in Stage 3, Pizza Party, which eliminated six competitors (including Austin Gray, who, like Najee Richardson, announced his retirement from competition following this tournament).

Advancing
Competitor
Kai Beckstrand
Caleb Bergstrom
Nacssa Garemore
Noah Meunier
Vance Walker

Not advancing
Competitor	Furthest obstacle
Joe Moravsky	Road Signs
Daniel Gil	Road Signs
Elijah Browning	Pizza Party
Josiah Pippel	Pizza Party
Sam Folsom	Pizza Party
Jackson Twait	Pizza Party
Austin Gray	Pizza Party
Sean Bryan	Pizza Party
Kyle Soderman	Ultimate Cliffhanger
Cal Plohoros	Slam Dunk

=== Stage 4 ===
Vance Walker became the first two-time American Ninja Warrior and the first to win $1,000,000 twice while Caleb Bergstrom became the sixth American Ninja Warrior and the third runner-up to achieve Total Victory.

Results
Rank	Competitor	Time
1	Vance Walker	00:27.60
2	Caleb Bergstrom	00:28.90
Failed
3	Noah Meunier	00:31.80
4	Nacssa Garemore	00:45.75
5	Kai Beckstrand	00:49.75

== Release ==
=== Broadcasting ===
On March 18, 2024, NBC revealed the premiere date and timeslot for the season. The program's longtime timeslot, Mondays 8 p.m. ET, was kept (with reruns scheduled to air in various slots due to sports); however for this season, like previous years, specifically to accommodate the 2024 Summer Olympics, episodes would mostly revert back to the previous two-hour format (with some exceptions), after Season 15 consisted mostly of one-hour episodes – mainly during the qualifying and early semifinal rounds – to allow the network to run a competition-based Monday prime time lineup for its Summer 2023 schedule (accompanied by fellow game shows The Wall and The Weakest Link, both of which share the lead out time slot this season).

=== Ratings ===
Episode		Air Date			
Episode		Air Date	Timeslot (ET)	Rating (18–49)	Viewers (Millions)
1	Qualifiers #1 & #2	June 3, 2024	Monday 8:00 PM	0.3	3.82
2	Qualifiers #3 & #4	June 10, 2024	Monday 8:00 PM	0.4	3.06
3	Qualifiers #5 & #6	July 1, 2024	Monday 8:00 PM	0.3	2.93
4	Qualifiers #7	July 8, 2024	Monday 8:00 PM	0.3	2.88
5	Qualifiers #8	July 15, 2024	Monday 8:00 PM	0.3	2.94
6	Semifinals #1 & #2	July 22, 2024	Monday 8:00 PM	0.3	2.46
7	Semifinals #3 & #4	August 12, 2024	Monday 8:00 PM	0.3	2.63
8	National Finals #1	August 19, 2024	Monday 8:00 PM	0.3	2.35
9	National Finals #2	August 26, 2024	Monday 8:00 PM	0.3	2.49
10	National Finals #3	September 2, 2024	Monday 8:00 PM	0.3	2.43
11	National Finals #4	September 9, 2024	Monday 8:00 PM	0.2	2.51
