= Jump City: Seattle =

- Genre: Reality; Sports
- Directed by: Matt Bartley
- Starring: Blair Herter; Brady Romberg
- Country of origin: United States
- Original language: English
- No. of seasons: 1
- No. of episodes: 8

Production
- Producers: Gabe Landau; John Moore
- Production location: Seattle, Washington
- Cinematography: Sebastian Jungwirth
- Editors: Carl Cramer; Paul Sadowski; Chris Sam; Eli Sentman; Stephen "Buzz" Wein
- Camera setup: Multiple
- Running time: 48 minutes
- Production companies: Pro Parkour; Little Pond Television Inc.

Original release
- Network: G4
- Release: February 15 – April 5, 2011

Jump City: Seattle is an American television series that aired on G4 from February 15 to April 5, 2011. It featured four of the top freerunning and parkour teams in the United States participating in a parkour competition. Each week, the athletes competed in different parkour challenges spread out across the streets of Seattle. The series ran for eight episodes and was not renewed for a second season. Team Tempest, led by Levi Meeuwenberg and Brian Orosco of American Ninja Warrior fame, won the competition.

== Background ==
Jump City: Seattle was promoted as the first American championship parkour competition. It was hosted by G4 correspondent Blair Herter and Parkour veteran Brady Romberg. Filming of the show was based in Seattle, and the show was produced by Fremantle Media, North America. The series premiere aired on February 15, 2011 with the season finale episode airing on April 5, 2011.

The show follows four teams participating in the Pro Parkour League (PPL), which was created specifically for the show. Four locations were used for the competition: Seattle City Hall, Freeway Park, Pioneer Square, Seattle Center, and Qwest Field.

After the show aired, several athletes competed in the subsequent season of American Ninja Warrior, which then aired on G4. One of the show's participants, David "Young Flip" Rodriguez, remain a top competitor to this day.

== Format ==
Each episode featured two of the four teams competing in a parkour "match", which consisted of two rounds: the Speed round and the Freestyle round. Should the teams split the two rounds, a sudden death tiebreaker would be used.

During the Pro Parkour League regular season, the four teams competed in a round-robin format, with the second and third placed teams competing in the semifinal match for the right to face the first place team in the Championship match at Qwest Field.

=== Speed Round ===
Three of the four members of the team participated in a relay race through a pre-determined set of parkour obstacles. Each leg of the relay had several "fly zones"; the competitors were required to touch every "fly zone" in their leg but were allowed to use any means by which to reach them. The team would incur a five-second penalty for each missed "fly zone". The team that completed the course the fastest, after penalties, won the round.

=== Freestyle Round ===
Three of the four members of the team received 45 seconds each to perform a freestyle parkour routine, utilizing anything in the area. After their run, competitors were judged on a scale of 1 to 10. Judging consisted of three elements:

- Creativity – how the competitors move through the obstacles in their run. They must show off a wide variety of moves and incorporate them in as much of the course as possible.
- Difficulty – the complexity of their moves.
- Execution – when performing a trick, competitors must stay in control, stick their landings, and connect all their moves together to create a flow (transition from one move to the next seamlessly).

The team with the higher sum of their three scores won the round.

=== Sudden Death ===
Should a sudden death tiebreaker be required, one member of each team would perform another parkour routine, this time lasting just 30 seconds. Judging worked the same as the freestyle round. The team with the higher score was declared the winner.

== Teams ==
=== Team Tempest ===
Based in Los Angeles, Tempest Freerunning was founded in 2007. Many of the team's members work as stuntmen in Hollywood.

Name	Nickname	Background
Paul Darnell	Diddy	Darnell founded Tempest Freerunning in 2007 with teammates Rich King, Gabe Nunez, and Victor Lopez. The four also participated in the inaugural Red Bull Art of Motion competition. He competed in the first season of American Ninja Warrior and subsequently qualified for the 23rd SASUKE competition.
Levi Meeuwenberg	Skynative	Meeuwenberg worked as a stuntman and was considered one of the most elite freerunners in the world. He participated in only two matches, as he broke his wrist while warming up during the team's second match. He participated in three seasons of American Ninja Warrior and competed on SASUKE five times; in his first SASUKE appearance, he was the only man to reach the Third Stage. Meeuwenberg retired from stuntwork and returned to his home state of Michigan to take up permaculture.
Brian Orosco	NoSole	Orosco is a stuntman who is known for his handlebar mustache. Like Meeuwenberg, he is a frequent American Ninja Warrior and SASUKE competitor, competing on the former for each of its first six seasons.
Caine Sinclair		Sinclair is known by fellow freerunners for his big drops and complexity. His style incorporates a variety of technical moves such as corkscrews and twists. He competed in the first three seasons of American Ninja Warrior, the first of which earned him qualification in SASUKE.

=== Miami Freerunning ===
Miami Freerunning emanates from Miami, Florida. The team members met in 2008. In order to become an official member, they have a ritual of being shot with a stun gun.

Name	Nickname	Background
Adrian Gonzalez		Gonzalez was a former Tribe member who later founded Miami Freerunning. He teaches kids and adults at his gym, Miami Freerunning and Parkour Academy.
David Rodriguez	Young Flip	Rodriguez is known for his black and white half-masks, which he wears so he can remain emotionless in competition. As of 2024, Rodriguez has participated in every season of American Ninja Warrior since Jump City: Seattle ended and also appeared in one tournament of SASUKE, making it to the Second Stage.
Albert Valladares	Spider	Valladares earned his nickname in his former career as a professional wrestler. He also competed in mixed martial arts before he became a stunt choreographer, performing various stunts for fight scenes. After the show, he became a member of Tempest Freerunning.
Jared Woods	J.J.	Woods, a former sprinter, is the fastest on his team. He incorporates both powerful vaults and a variety of handstand poses.

=== The Tribe ===
Founded in Washington, D.C., Tribe is America's first parkour team,. As Tribe founder Michael Zernow says, "This is art. This is physicality. This is being able to take your life into your own hands, so it wouldn't just be about kids on YouTube doing crazy stuff."

Name	Nickname	Background
Travis Graves	Noble	Graves is very competitive and has the ability to combine speed with power.
Billy Hughes	Skipper	Hughes is a former competitive diver training for the Olympics, which he channels with his parkour and freerunning.
Jereme Sanders		Sanders incorporates martial arts moves into his freerunning technique.
Michael Zernow	Frosti	Founder and team leader. A teacher of parkour, he has many years of experience. He also appeared on Survivor: China and four seasons of American Ninja Warrior.

=== Team Rogue ===
Team Rogue was specifically created for the show with the intent on highlighting up-and-coming freerunners.

Name	Nickname	Background/Style
Dylan Baker		At 18, Baker was the youngest freerunner in the competition. He still remains in the competitive freerunning scene.
Drew Drechsel		Drechsel's style includes huge flips off high platforms. After the show, he became one of the top competitors on both American Ninja Warrior and SASUKE, competing on the former nine times and the latter eight times. He later became a member of The Tribe before becoming a full-time American Ninja Warrior trainer. He was arrested in 2020 for soliciting sex from minors.
Korey Sarvas		Sarvas was a former soccer player who got into parkour because it challenged his mind and body. He died from a drowning accident in the early morning of December 5, 2011.
Jake Smith		Smith is an all-around trickster who is very creative in his freeruns. He also competed on American Ninja Warrior on several occasions and SASUKE once.

== Episodes ==
=== Regular Season Matches ===
==== Week 1: Tempest vs. Rogue ====
Original Airdate	Location(s)	Parkour Teams	Speed Round	Freestyle Round	Sudden Death Round	Winning team
February 15, 2011	Seattle City Hall; Freeway Park*	Tempest	Time: 56:27	Orosco = 7.4; Darnell = 7.0; Meeuwenberg = 8.8; Total: 23.2	Meeuwenberg = 9.1	Tempest
February 15, 2011	Seattle City Hall; Freeway Park*	Parkour Team	Speed Round	Freestyle Round	Sudden Death Round	Losing Team
February 15, 2011	Seattle City Hall; Freeway Park*	Rogue	Time: (52:85) 57:85*	Baker = 8.3; Smith = 8.0; Sarvas = 8.4; Total: 24.7	Baker = 8.4	Rogue

- * The competition was moved from City Hall to Freeway Park in the middle of the Freestyle Round because of rain.
- * A five-second penalty was imposed on Rogue when Sarvas missed a "fly zone" on the course.

==== Week 2: Tribe vs. Miami Freerunning ====
Original Airdate	Location(s)	Parkour Teams	Speed Round	Freestyle Round	Winning team
February 22, 2011	Freeway Park	Tribe	Time: 55:65	Hughes = 7.9; Graves = 7.9; Zernow = 8.5; Total: 24.3	Tribe
February 22, 2011	Freeway Park	Parkour Team	Speed Round	Freestyle Round	Losing Team
February 22, 2011	Freeway Park	Miami Freerunning	Time: 56:52	Woods* = 7.9; Valladares = 8.3; Gonzalez = 8.0; Total: 24.2	Miami Freerunning

- * David Rodriguez removed himself from the freestyle round after suffering a leg injury in the speed round. Reserve, Jared Woods, replaced him.

==== Week 3: Rogue vs. Tribe ====
Original Airdate	Location(s)	Parkour Teams	Speed Round	Freestyle Round	Winning team
March 1, 2011	Downtown Seattle (alleyway)	Rogue	Time: (43:25) 48:25*	Smith = 8.2; Baker = 8.7; Drechsel = 8.5; Total: 25.4	Rogue
March 1, 2011	Downtown Seattle (alleyway)	Parkour Team	Speed Round	Freestyle Round	Losing Team
March 1, 2011	Downtown Seattle (alleyway)	Tribe	Time: 50:25	Zernow = 8.4; Sanders = 7.6; Graves = 7.8; Total: 23.8	Tribe

- * A five-second penalty was imposed on Rogue when Smith missed a "fly zone" on the course.

==== Week 4: Tempest vs. Miami Freerunning ====
Original Airdate	Location(s)	Parkour Teams	Speed Round	Freestyle Round	Winning Team
March 8, 2011	Downtown Seattle (alleyway at night time)	Tempest	Time: 50:33	Orosco = 8.8; Sinclair* = 7.5; Darnell = 8.0; Total: 24.3	Tempest
March 8, 2011	Downtown Seattle (alleyway at night time)	Parkour Team	Speed Round	Freestyle Round	Losing Team
March 8, 2011	Downtown Seattle (alleyway at night time)	Miami Freerunning	Time: 55:89	Rodriguez = 7.8; Gonzalez = 7.5; Woods = 8.3; Total: 23.6	Miami Freerunning

- *Levi Meeuwenberg was forced out of the competition after injuring his left wrist while practicing on an elevated bar for the speed round. Later, it was revealed by a medic that he fractured his wrist and would be out the entire season. (Although commonly cited as the injury that kept him out of Sasuke 26, this was a separate injury.) Reserve player Caine Sinclair would take Meeuwenberg's place for the rest of the season. On another note Sinclair had come in with a broken toe on his left foot and injured his right ankle in the speed round.

==== Week 5: Tempest vs. Tribe ====
Original Airdate	Location(s)	Parkour Teams	Speed Round	Freestyle Round	Sudden Death Round	Winning Team
March 15, 2011	Seattle Center (rooftop)	Tempest	Time: 46:33	Sinclair* = 8.3; Darnell = 8.1; Orosco = 7.8; Total: 24.2	Orosco = 9.0	Tempest
March 15, 2011	Seattle Center (rooftop)	Parkour Team	Speed Round	Freestyle Round	Sudden Death Round	Losing Team
March 15, 2011	Seattle Center (rooftop)	Tribe	Time: 43:71	Zernow = 7.7; Sanders* = 7.5; Hughes = 7.6; Total: 22.8	Hughes = 8.4	Tribe

- *Caine Sinclair competed with an injury—a broken toe on his left foot that he injured before the season began. He suffered through that and also "tweaked" his ankle in week 4.
- *Perhaps from nerves, Sanders threw up before the speed round, but still managed to compete.

==== Week 6: Rogue vs. Miami Freerunning ====
Original Airdate	Location(s)	Parkour Teams	Speed Round	Freestyle Round	Winning Team
March 22, 2011	Seattle Center (rooftop)	Rogue	Time: 44:51	Drechsel* = 8.0; Sarvas = 7.8; Smith = 8.0; Total: 23.8	Rogue
March 22, 2011	Seattle Center (rooftop)	Parkour Team	Speed Round	Freestyle Round	Losing Team
March 22, 2011	Seattle Center (rooftop)	Miami Freerunning	Time: 47:20	Woods = 7.6; Valladares = 8.6; Gonazlez = 7.5; Total: 23.7	Miami Freerunning

- *Drew Drechsel competed with an injury to his toe popping out on his right foot that he injured during the speed round, but remained in the freestyle round.

=== Playoffs ===
==== Week 7: Tribe vs. Rogue ====
Original Airdate	Location(s) City Hall	Parkour Teams	Speed Round	Freestyle Round	Winning Team
March 29, 2011	Seattle City Hall	Tribe	Time: 49.74	Graves = 7.5; Hughes = 8.5; Zernow = 8.9; Total: 24.9	Tribe
March 29, 2011	Seattle City Hall	Parkour Team	Speed Round	Freestyle Round	Losing Team
March 29, 2011	Seattle City Hall	Rogue	Time: 51.55	Smith = 7.7; Baker = 8.2; Drechsel = 8.2; Total: 24.1	Rogue

NOTE: The course was entirely changed from its Week 1 set-up so as not to give Team Rogue an advantage.

==== Week 8: Tempest vs. Tribe (Championship Match) ====
Original Airdate	Location(s)	Parkour Teams	Speed Round	Freestyle Round	Sudden Death Round	Winning Team
April 5, 2011	Qwest Field	Tempest	Time: 1:32:10	Sinclair = 8.5; Darnell = 8.1; Orosco = 8.5; Total: 25.1	Orosco = 9.0	Tempest
April 5, 2011	Qwest Field	Parkour Team	Speed Round	Freestyle Round	Sudden Death Round	Losing Team
April 5, 2011	Qwest Field	Tribe	Time: 1:24:28	Graves = 7.9; Hughes = 8.2; Zernow = 8.4; Total: 24.5	Zernow = 8.6	Tribe

== Season standings ==
=== Regular season ===
(After 6 Matches/Week 6)

Team	Win	Loss
Tempest (C)	3	0
Rogue*	2	1
Tribe	1	2
Miami Freerunning (X)	0	3

(C) = Championship Berth / (X) = Eliminated / * = Eliminated in the play-offs

Championship Match

Championship final
Tempest*	1
Tribe	0

- *Team Tempest is the first ever Pro Parkour League (PPL) champions.

== See also ==
- American Ninja Challenge
- American Ninja Warrior
- Sasuke (TV series)
- Ultimate Parkour Challenge
