= American Ninja Warrior season 1 =

Season of American reality/sport competition television series American Ninja Warrior

American Ninja Warrior
- Season 1
- Hosted by: Blair Herter; Alison Haislip
- Finals venue: Sasuke 23
- No. of episodes: 8

Release
- Original network: G4
- Original release: December 12 – December 19, 2009

Season chronology
- Next → Season 2

The first season of American Ninja Warrior premiered on December 12, 2009, with the first four episodes of the season. The final four episodes were released on December 19, 2009. The season was hosted by Blair Herter and Alison Haislip and the finalists were sent to Japan to compete in Sasuke 23. All eight aired on G4, an American television network. Levi Meeuwenberg was the "Last Ninja Standing," meaning he made it the furthest of any American competitor on Sasuke 23. The season operated on a lower budget than any other season, and only one contestant who competed in the first season has also competed in all the other seasons: David Campbell.

== Notable Competitors ==
Notable competitors this season included:

- Professional freerunner Levi Meeuwenberg
- Professional freerunner Brian Orosco
- Professional MMA fighter Jason "Mayhem" Miller
- Former American Gladiator Xin Wuku

== Obstacles ==
Season 1 Obstacle Chart
Event	Obstacles								
Qualifiers	Quintuple Steps	Rope Swing	Barrel Roll	Spider Wall	Pipe Slider	Warped Wall	N/A		
Semifinals	Quintuple Steps	Rope Swing	Barrel Roll	Spider Wall	Pipe Slider	Warped Wall	Tarzan Swing	Jumping Bars	Cargo Climb

Mount Midoriyama (Sasuke 23)
Event	Obstacle(s)								Finishers
Stage 1	Twelve Timbers	Curtain Slider	Log Grip	Jumping Spider	Half Pipe Attack	Warped Wall	Slider Jump	Final Climb	3
Stage 2	Downhill Jump	Salmon Ladder	Stick Slider	Unstable Bridge	Metal Spin	Wall Lift			1
Stage 3	Arm Rings	Globe Grasp	Devil Steps	Cliff Hanger	Jumping Bars	Ascending Climb	Spider Flip	Final Ring	0
Stage 4	Heavenly Ladder				G-Rope				N/A

== Results ==
=== Qualifiers ===
The top thirty competitors moved on.

Top 30 Competitors
Rank	Competitor	Time	Furthest Obstacle
1	William Spencer	0:33	Finished
2	David Campbell	0:35	Finished
3	Paul Darnell	0:35	Finished
4	Rich King	0:35	Finished
5	Chris Delfin	0:37	Finished
6	Ryan Cousins	0:37	Finished
7	Levi Meeuwenberg	0:38	Finished
8	Caine Sinclair	0:39	Finished
9	Dorian Cedars	0:39	Finished
10	Jazon Khazi	0:41	Finished
11	Matt Marshall	0:42	Finished
12	Travis Furlanic	0:42	Finished
13	Brian Orosco	0:44	Finished
14	David Gruner	0:44	Finished
15	Sean Morris	0:45	Finished
16	Gabe Nunez	0:45	Finished
17	Geoff Iida	0:46	Finished
18	Elias Worsencroft	0:46	Finished
19	Andrew Karsen	0:47	Finished
20	Andrew Taber	0:47	Finished
21	Ruselis Perry	0:47	Finished
22	Jacob Smith	0:48	Finished
23	Shane Daniels	0:51	Finished
24	Sam Reynolds	0:52	Finished
25	Gabriel Cortes	0:55	Finished
26	Rick Huelga	0:58	Finished
27	Joop Katana	0:59	Finished
28	Tra Truong	0:59	Finished
29	Matt Asanuma	0:59	Finished
30	Brian Kretsch	1:00	Finished

=== Semifinals ===
The top 15 finalists move onto the finals.

Top 15 Competitors
Rank	Competitor	Time	Furthest Obstacle
1	William Spencer	1:23	Finished
2	Levi Meeuwenberg	1:28	Finished
3	David Campbell	1:30	Finished
4	Sean Morris	1:32	Finished
5	Travis Furlanic	1:32	Finished
6	Paul Darnell	1:34	Finished
7	Rich King	1:35	Finished
8	Ryan Cousins	1:36	Finished
9	Shane Daniels	1:39	Finished
10	Caine Sinclair	1:41	Finished
11	Andrew Karsen	1:41	Finished
12	Rick Huelga	1:41	Finished
13	Brian Orosco	1:45	Finished
14	Geoff Iida	1:48	Finished
15	Joop Katana	1:49	Finished

=== Finals ===
In the finals, competitors must face two challenges. The two times on each challenge combined are a given contestant's total time. The ten contestants with the top times go on to compete in Sasuke 23.

Challenge #1: Competitors must shove 10 large slabs across a 50-foot (15 m) distance and arrange them in a pyramidal structure while a bungee cord (with a big tire on the end) is strapped to them.

Challenge #2: In the first of three parts in this challenge competitors must crawl under a cargo net. Then, they must walk across two logs with a heavy barrel lifted high over their head. Finally, they must run through a forest of tires without touching them.

Top 10 Competitors
Rank	Competitor	Time
1	Brian Orosco	1:53.00
2	Levi Meeuwenberg	1:54.50
3	Travis Furlanic	1:58.40
4	Paul Darnell	2:03.50
5	Rich King	2:07.50
6	Caine Sinclair	2:14.60
7	Shane Daniels	2:17.90
8	Geoff Iida	2:18.70
9	Joop Katana	2:28.80
10	Rick Huelga	2:29.00

Not Advancing
Rank	Competitor	Time
11	Andrew Karsen	2:34.30
12	Ryan Cousins	2:34.50
13	David Campbell	2:39.50
14	Sean Morris	2:40.60
15	William Spencer	Withdrew

=== Mount Midoriyama ===
==== Stage 1 ====
Stage 1 Competitors
Rank	Competitor	Time	Furthest Obstacle
1	Rick Huelga	None	Slider Jump
2	Joop Katana	None	Slider Jump
3	Geoff Iida	None	Warped Wall
4	Shane Daniels	None	Final Climb
5	Caine Sinclair	None	Final Climb
6	Rich King	1:46.60	Finished
7	Paul Darnell	None	Half-Pipe Attack
8	Travis Furlanic	None	Jumping Spider
9	Levi Meeuwenberg	1:30.80	Finished
10	Brian Orosco	1:41.35	Finished

==== Stage 2 ====
Stage 2 Competitors
Rank	Competitor	Time	Furthest Obstacle
1	Rich King	None	Unstable Bridge
2	Brian Orosco	None	Unstable Bridge
3	Levi Meeuwenberg	51.86	Finished

==== Stage 3 ====
Stage 3 Competitors
Rank	Competitor	Time	Furthest Obstacle
1	Levi Meeuwenberg	None	Cliff Hanger

== Episode air dates ==
Air Dates
Episode Title	Air Date
Episode 1	December 12, 2009
Episode 2	December 12, 2009
Episode 3	December 12, 2009
Episode 4	December 12, 2009
Episode 5	December 19, 2009
Episode 6	December 19, 2009
Episode 7	December 19, 2009
Episode 8	December 19, 2009
