= Jimmy Smith (fighter) =

American mixed martial arts commentator

- Born: James Smith; September 2, 1977 (age 49); Fresno, California, U.S.
- Education: University of California, Los Angeles
- Occupations: Commentator; television host
- Years active: 2007–present
- Martial arts career
- Height: 5 ft 11 in (1.80 m)
- Division: Welterweight
- Reach: 67.0 in (170 cm)
- Style: Brazilian Jiu-Jitsu, Boxing, Wrestling, Muay Thai
- Fighting out of: Los Angeles, California
- Team: Rey Diogo BJJ/Carlson Gracie BJJ
- Rank: Black belt in Brazilian jiu-jitsu under Ricardo Diogo
- Years active: 2003–2006

Mixed martial arts record
- Total: 6
- Wins: 5
- By submission: 4
- By decision: 1
- Losses: 1
- By decision: 1

Other information
- Mixed martial arts record from Sherdog

James Smith (born September 2, 1977) is an American sports broadcaster and former mixed martial artist. He was the co-host of the television show Fight Quest, with Doug Anderson, on the Discovery Channel. He is also a former commentator for Bellator, UFC, Premier Boxing Champions and WWE's Raw brand. He is a former host for American Ninja Warrior in 2010–2011.

== Early life ==
Smith was born on September 2, 1977. He was a former high school wrestler and teacher. He attended UCLA in college but at that time, they did not have a wrestling team so some students who wrestled in high school would meet at the Wooden Center to wrestle. He was introduced to Brazilian jiu-jitsu when during one of their wrestling sessions a BJJ instructor invited him to attend a class that night at the same room. After graduating Smith trained at Team Punishment.

== Mixed martial arts career ==
Smith had planned to attend graduate school at UCLA but did not get admitted. He decided to turn pro in MMA and accepted a fight on 2 days' notice in a regional unsanctioned event, he won the fight in 30 seconds with an armbar. He had a total of 6 MMA fights and only lost 1. He decided to quit fighting after getting accepted for a job as a host for the Discovery Channel's show Fight Quest.

== Commentary career ==
=== Mixed martial arts and boxing ===
Smith got an audition for Fight Quest a week after his last fight and got the job. He hosted Fight Quest for 2 seasons with Doug Anderson. It last aired on October 3, 2008. After Fight Quest, he received an email from Pride's former VP, Jerry Millen, to do an M-1 Global show in Amsterdam as they needed a color commentator last-minute. Millen had seen Fight Quest and sent a message to both Smith and Anderson and whoever got back first would have gotten the job. He got the job and that's how he transitioned from MMA to hosting to commentating. In 2010, Smith started to be the color commentator for Bellator in season 2 after their TV-deal agreements with Fox Sports Net, NBC and Telemundo. In the same year, Smith started to host American Ninja Warrior for its second season. Smith co-hosted American Ninja Warrior until the third season before being replaced by Jonny Moseley for the fourth season. On March 13, 2015, Smith provided co-hosting duties together with former boxing champion Antonio Tarver for Premier Boxing Champions. On December 28, 2017, Bellator announced that they have parted ways with Smith after a 7-year run.

On January 12, 2018, Smith signed with the UFC. On January 1, 2019, Smith revealed that UFC did not renew his contract as a commentator.

On March 8, 2019, it was announced that Smith joined Invicta FC as a commentator.

=== Professional wrestling ===
On May 26, 2021, WWE named Smith as play-by-play commentator for Monday Night Raw, replacing Adnan Virk. On October 6, 2022, Smith announced his departure from WWE and was replaced by Kevin Patrick.

=== Freestyle wrestling ===
He worked as lead commentator for Real American Freestyle at RAF 04 on December 20, 2025.

== Personal life ==
Smith has a black belt in Brazilian jiu-jitsu under Ricardo "Rey" Diogo.

== Mixed martial arts record ==
Professional record breakdown
6 matches	5 wins	1 loss
By submission	4	0
By decision	1	1

Res.	Record	Opponent	Method	Event	Date	Round	Time	Location	Notes
Win	5–1	Jason Chambers	Submission (heel hook)	Pangea Fights 1: The Beginning	May 12, 2006	1	1:55	Hollywood, California, United States	
Loss	4–1	Andy Wang	Decision (split)	Total Fighting Alliance 2	April 7, 2006	3	5:00	Carson, California, United States	
Win	4–0	Vince Gooseman	Submission (armbar)	King of the Cage 61: Flash Point	September 23, 2005	1	2:50	San Jacinto, California, United States	
Win	3–0	Mario Ackerbert	Submission (armbar)	Gladiator Challenge 36: Proving Grounds	April 9, 2005	1	0:29	California, United States	
Win	2–0	James Wilks	Submission (kneebar)	King of the Cage 37: Hitmaster	August 6, 2004	1	1:40	San Jacinto, California, United States	
Win	1–0	Matt Stansell	Decision	King of the Cage 31	December 6, 2003	2	5:00	San Jacinto, California, United States	

Preceded by Adnan Virk	Raw lead announcer 2021–2022	Succeeded by Kevin Patrick
