= American Ninja Warrior season 3 =

Season of American reality/sport competition television series American Ninja Warrior

American Ninja Warrior
- Season 3
- Hosted by: Matt Iseman; Jimmy Smith; Alison Haislip
- No. of contestants: 300+
- No. of episodes: 10

Release
- Original network: G4; NBC
- Original release: July 31 – August 22, 2011

Season chronology
- ← Previous; Season 2 Next → Season 4

The third season of American Ninja Warrior began airing on July 31, 2011, on G4. Tryouts took place in May 2011 at Venice Beach, California. After the tryouts, the top 15 competitors competed in Ninja Warrior Boot Camp with the top 10 moving on to Japan for the finals of the competition as a part of Sasuke 27 and a chance at becoming the first American to conquer the course and win a $500,000 endorsement deal with K-Swiss. No competitors made it beyond stage 3. This season was once again hosted by Matt Iseman and Jimmy Smith, with Alison Haislip as a sideline reporter. The final episode aired on August 22, 2011, as a two-hour primetime special on NBC.

== Qualifying ==
Over 300 competitors took part in the tryouts in Venice Beach, CA on May 16, 2011, and May 17, 2011. Those who made it past qualifying, city finals, and boot-camp in the California Mountains advanced to Stage 1 at Sasuke 27.

=== Boot Camp ===
15 competitors from the semifinals tried ninja Boot Camp. The ninjas were divided into three teams of five: the Red Dragons, the Blue Monkeys, and the White Tigers. Ten would make it at the end, and five would be sent home. Every week there would be challenges the ninjas would have to face. The losing teams would send two of their members to the Heavenly Ropes. Two people would be sent up the rope, and the person that rung the bell at the top first would move on and continue the boot camp until they either were sent home or made it to "Sasuke 27". The losing person would be sent home, failing to make it to Japan. The five that were eliminated in boot camp were Dustin Rocho, Chris Wilczewski, Brandon Douglass, Alan Connealy, and Brian Orosco.

=== Notable competitors ===
- Denver Broncos wide receiver, Matt Willis
- 2009 World Champion freerunner, Tim "Livewire" Shieff
- Professional freerunner and Survivor: China contestant, Michael "Frosti" Zernow

== Mount Midoriyama ==
=== Stage 1 ===
Order #	Finalist	Result	Notes
1	James "The Beast" McGrath	Finish (1:42.76)	
2	Drew Drechsel	6. Warped Wall	Injured right knee on Half Pipe Attack landing.
3	Travis Rosen	Finish (1:43.30)	
4	Ryan Stratis	Finish (1:51.03)	
5	Brent Steffensen	Finish (1:32.08)	
6	Jake Smith	Finish (1:57.65)	Digest.
7	David "Flip" Rodriguez	Finish (1:47.27)	Digest.
8	Travis Furlanic	Finish (1:21.10)	Digest.
9	Paul Kasemir	Finish (1:38.45)	
10	David Campbell	Finish (1:20.68)	Sasuke First Stage speed record.

=== Stage 2 ===
Order #	Finalist	Result	Notes
1	Jake Smith	2. Double Salmon Ladder	Seventh level.
2	James "The Beast" McGrath	Finish (1:12.42)	
3	David "Flip" Rodriguez	1. Slider Drop	Derailed bar on drop.
4	Travis Rosen	5. Metal Spin	
5	Ryan Stratis	Finish (1:11.90)	
6	Travis Furlanic	5. Metal Spin	
7	Brent Steffensen	5. Metal Spin	
8	Paul Kasemir	Finish (1:25.02)	
9	David Campbell	Finish (1:15.59)	

=== Stage 3 ===
Order #	Finalist	Result	Notes
1	James McGrath	3. Ultimate Cliffhanger	Transition to fifth ledge.
2	Ryan Stratis	3. Ultimate Cliffhanger	Transition to fourth ledge.
3	Paul Kasemir	3. Ultimate Cliffhanger	Transition to fifth ledge.
4	David Campbell	3. Ultimate Cliffhanger	Lost grip on sixth ledge. Best performance of the season.

== Ratings ==
Network	Episode		Air date	Timeslot	18–49 rating	Viewers (millions)	Ref.
G4	1	"Part 1 of 10"	July 31, 2011	Sunday 9:00 p.m.	0.2	0.384	
G4	2	"Part 2 of 10"	July 31, 2011	Sunday 10:00 p.m.	0.1	0.350	
G4	3	"Part 3 of 10"	August 7, 2011	Sunday 9:00 p.m.	0.1	0.292	
G4	4	"Part 4 of 10"	August 7, 2011	Sunday 10:00 p.m.	0.1	0.329	
G4	5	"Part 5 of 10"	August 14, 2011	Sunday 9:00 p.m.	0.1	0.216	
G4	6	"Part 6 of 10"	August 14, 2011	Sunday 10:00 p.m.	0.1	0.244	
G4	7	"Part 7 of 10"	August 21, 2011	Sunday 9:00 p.m.	0.1	0.296	
G4	8	"Part 8 of 10"	August 21, 2011	Sunday 10:00 p.m.	0.1	0.251	
NBC	9	"Part 9 of 10"	August 22, 2011	Monday 9:00 p.m.	1.7	4.103	
NBC	10	"Part 10 of 10"	August 22, 2011	Monday 9:00 p.m.	1.7	4.103	
