= Fight Quest =

- Genre: Sports, Fighting
- Starring: Doug Anderson; Jimmy Smith
- Country of origin: United States
- Original language: English
- No. of seasons: 2
- No. of episodes: 13

Production
- Running time: 60 minutes

Original release
- Network: Discovery Channel
- Release: December 28, 2007 – October 3, 2008

Fight Quest is a television show on the Discovery Channel that had a preview episode air on December 28, 2007, and began airing weekly on January 4, 2008. The show followed Jimmy Smith and Doug Anderson as they travel around the world learning different styles of martial arts, spending five days training with notable masters of the styles they are studying, before exhibiting what they have learned in a final demonstration and/or fight. According to quotes by the hosts, the show was mostly unscripted and a true challenge. At the end of February an updated DVD box set was released that included the final three episodes not in the original release. The series was canceled at the beginning of the second season and only three episodes aired, the last one ended on October 3, 2008.

== Episodes ==
=== Season 1 ===
Episode #	Country	City	Martial Art/Style	Masters	Original airdate
1.1	China	Dengfeng	Kung Fu (Shaolin Kung Fu; Sanda)	Shi De Yang, Shi De Cheng	December 28, 2007
1.2	Philippines	Manila	Kali	Leo Gaje; Cristino Vasquez	January 4, 2008
1.3	Japan	Tokyo	Kyokushin Karate	Yuzo Goda, Isamu Fukuda	January 11, 2008
1.4	Mexico	Mexico City	Boxing	Ignacio "Nacho" Beristáin; Tiburcio Garcia	January 18, 2008
1.5	Indonesia	Bandung	Pencak Silat	Rita Suwanda; Dadang Gunawan	January 25, 2008
1.6	France	Marseille	Savate	Christian Robert, Frank May; Frederic Baret, Laurent Bois; Patrick Gellat	February 1, 2008
1.7	South Korea	Seoul	Hapkido	Kim Nam Je, Bae Sung Book; Ju Soong Weo	February 8, 2008
1.8	Brazil	Rio de Janeiro	Brazilian Jiu-Jitsu	Breno Sivak, Renato Barreto; Royler Gracie, Rickson Gracie	February 15, 2008
1.9	Israel	Netanya	Krav Maga	Ran Nakash; Avivit Oftek Cohen	February 22, 2008
1.10	United States	Bay Area, California	Kajukenbo	Charles Gaylord, Greg Harper	February 29, 2008

=== Season 2 ===
Episode #	Country	City	Martial Art/Style	Masters	Original airdate
2.1	Thailand	Bangkok	Muay Thai	Thakoon Pongsupha, Karim "Palang" Pattana	September 26, 2008
2.2	India	Kozhikode	Kalarippayattu	Guru suresh nambiar, Guru Sunil Kumar	September 26, 2008
2.3	Hong Kong	Hong Kong	Wing Chun	Leung Ting, Sifu Kong Chi Keung	October 3, 2008

== See also ==
- Fight Science
- Human Weapon
- Kill Arman
- Rallarsving
- Lucie Bertaud also had a similar show called Face a Face which was done in France.
