= Matt Iseman =

American physician, comedian, and television personality

- Born: January 22, 1971 (age 55); Denver, Colorado, U.S.
- Education: Princeton University (BA); Columbia University (MD)
- Occupations: Comedian, actor, television host, physician
- Height: 193 cm (6 ft 4 in)

Matthew C. Iseman (born January 22, 1971) is an American comedian, actor, and television host, who began his career as a physician. He is best known for his role as the play-by-play announcer and the moderator of American Ninja Warrior. He was the winner of The New Celebrity Apprentice in 2017, the show's only season.

Iseman is also known for his involvement with the sport of Strongman where he does athlete interviews for Arnold Strongman Classic, Shaw Classic and Rogue Invitational.

== Early life and medical career ==
Iseman was born in Denver, Colorado. The son of a pulmonologist, Iseman was raised in Denver and followed his father into a medical career, earning a B.A. with honors from Princeton University and an M.D. from Columbia University College of Physicians and Surgeons. Iseman is of Ashkenazi Jewish, Irish, Danish, and English descent. He did his internship and residency in internal medicine at the University of Colorado Hospital in his hometown of Denver, and later relocated to the Los Angeles area.

== Comedy career ==
Iseman began doing stand-up comedy, with a routine based partly on his experiences as a doctor. He worked with the improvisational comedy troupe The Groundlings, and in 2002 became a full-time professional comedian. In addition to comedy club work, Iseman's medical background has led to performing for medical and health-related organizations. He has performed at USO shows in Afghanistan, South Korea, Bosnia, and Hungary.

He cites Brian Regan as a comedy inspiration. Iseman's comedy outside of humor about medicine and medical profession is mainly observational, and he generally avoids off-color material.

== Television work ==
Iseman has hosted the game shows Scream Play on E! and Casino Night on GSN. He appears as a regular cast member on the home makeover show Clean House and its companion outtakes show, Clean House Comes Clean, both on the Style Network. Additionally, as of 2024, he hosted every season of American Ninja Warrior on the channel G4 and later on the NBC network with the exception of the very first season. Iseman began working with American Ninja Warrior in 2010. He uses his athleticism and work as a comedian to add his style to the show with Akbar Gbaja-Biamila (former NFL player), and Zuri Hall (sideline correspondent).

He also has worked episodically in television shows including The Drew Carey Show, NCIS, and General Hospital. He has appeared on the syndicated MAD TV, Comedy Central's Premium Blend, Fox's The Best Damn Sports Show Period, and Fox News Channel's Red Eye w/ Greg Gutfeld. He was the narrator of Dumbest Stuff on Wheels on SPEED. As of May 4, 2010, Iseman is the host of Sports Soup, a spin-off of E!'s The Soup, on Versus.

Iseman won the 15th overall season and first run of The New Celebrity Apprentice and appeared as one of the contestants in the third episode of RuPaul's Secret Celebrity Drag Race to raise funds for the Arthritis Foundation.

Iseman is the new host of Live Rescue on A&E, taking over for former host Ashleigh Banfield.

Iseman also fills in as a guest host on REELZ On Patrol: Live as needed.

== Personal life ==
Iseman was diagnosed with rheumatoid arthritis in 2002, at age 31. His disease is being treated successfully.

Iseman is a cancer survivor. In 2018, he wrote on his Instagram account that he had part of a kidney removed due to cancer more than 10 years earlier.

Matt Iseman's wife is named Britton All. They got married in September 2024. Matt proposed to her in a spontaneous way that included Arnold Schwarzenegger.

== Selected filmography ==
=== Television ===
==== As actor ====
Year	Title	Role	Notes
2003	General Hospital	Rock Fowler	
2010	P Lo's House	Dr. Tuck	TV movie
2013	The League	Airport Police Officer	Episode: "The Bye Week"
2014	Hot in Cleveland	Mike	Episode: "The Undead"
2017	American Dad!	Demon Sportscaster	Voice, episode: "The Life and Times of Stan Smith"

==== As himself ====
Year	Title	Role	Notes
2003–2011	Clean House	Go-to guy	Main/Recurring role
2010–present	American Ninja Warrior	Host	
2011–2012	Dumbest Stuff on Wheels	Narrator	
2013–2017	Home & Family	Guest / Co-host	Multiple episodes
2014–2020	Today	Guest / Segment co-host	Multiple episodes
2016	American Ninja Warrior: Ninja vs. Ninja	Host	
2017	The New Celebrity Apprentice	Contestant	
2018–2019	American Ninja Warrior Junior	Host	
2019	Live Rescue	Host	
2019–present	25 Words or Less	Celebrity guest	Multiple episodes
2020	RuPaul's Secret Celebrity Drag Race	Special guest / Bette Bourdeaux	Episode:"RuPaul roast"
2022	Shaw Classic	Host / Emcee	
2023–2024	On Patrol: Live	Guest Host	Multiple episodes - US Thanksgiving 2023 and 2024

=== Video game ===
Year	Title	Role	Note
2019	American Ninja Warrior: Challenge	Himself	Voice
