= Blair Herter =

American television personality

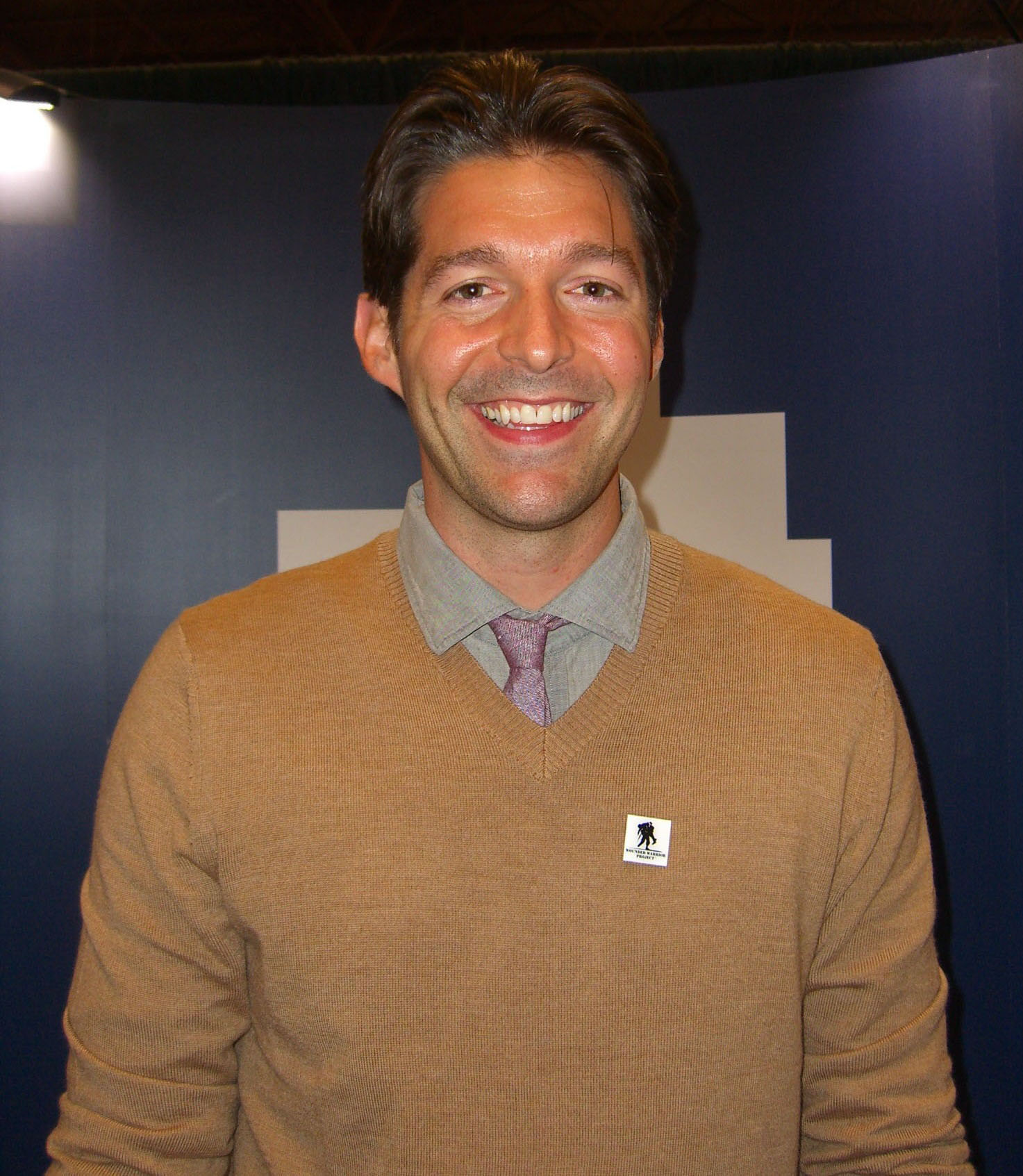
- Herter at the New York Comic Con in 2012
- Born: Blair Joseph Herter; June 23, 1980 (age 46); Scott, Louisiana, United States
- Occupations: Presenter, television producer
- Years active: 2001–present
- Spouse: Jessica Chobot (m. 2012)
- Children: 1

Blair Joseph Herter (born June 23, 1980) is an American television personality, known for his appearances on TV series such as Road Rules: The Quest, Real World/Road Rules Challenge, Attack of the Show!, X-Play and American Ninja Warrior.

== Early life ==
Herter was born in Scott, Louisiana and attended University of Louisiana Lafayette.

== Career ==
Herter worked for MTV, appearing on seasons of Road Rules and Real World/Road Rules Challenge series, as well as G-Hole. Blair served as the host for the After Show on MTV.com for Challenge seasons The Inferno II, The Gauntlet 2, and Fresh Meat. In 2007 he joined the G4 Network as a producer and recurring substitute host for Attack of the Show! (and its "The Feed" segment) and X-Play. He co-hosted the inaugural season of American Ninja Warrior with Alison Haislip. During the 2013 Electronic Entertainment Expo, Blair co-anchored Microsoft's nightly Xbox @ E3 Live streaming event coverage on Xbox Live with former G4 personalities Morgan Webb and Kevin Pereira. Herter joined Midnight Oil Agency as an executive director for business development and in 2019 joined the marketing group Advncr as chief brand officer and senior vice president of partnerships.

In 2020, he returned to G4 as vice president of content partnerships and brand development for Comcast Spectacor, the division overseeing the relaunch.

In 2022, Herter left G4 and moved to the Netherlands to take an executive position with Team Liquid.

== Personal life ==
In 2012, Herter married fellow G4 personality Jessica Chobot. They have a son, Emerson Roland Herter.
