= American Ninja Warrior =

American competition television series

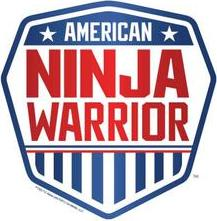
- Genre: Reality television; Game show
- Based on: Sasuke by Ushio Higuchi
- Directed by: Jay Hunter; Patrick McManus
- Presented by: Blair Herter; Alison Haislip; Matt Iseman; Jimmy Smith; Jonny Moseley; Angela Sun; Akbar Gbaja-Biamila; Jenn Brown; Kristine Leahy; Zuri Hall
- Country of origin: United States
- Original language: English
- No. of seasons: 18
- No. of episodes: 262

Production
- Executive producers: Craig Piligian; Andrea Richter; Arthur Smith; Kent Weed; Holly Wofford; Viki Cacciatore; Brian Richardson; Anthony Storm; Kristen Stabile
- Camera setup: Multi-camera
- Running time: 36–128 minutes
- Production companies: Pilgrim Films & Television (season 1); A. Smith & Co. Productions (season 2 – present); Lake Paradise Entertainment (season 2–5); Tokyo Broadcasting System; Universal Television; G4 Media (seasons 1–5); USA Network Media Productions (seasons 9–17); NBC Entertainment (Note: The division is primarily owned by a legal name of a trademark known as NBC West, LLC., not actually owned by either NBCUniversal or Comcast.) (season 18–present)

Original release
- Network: G4
- Release: December 12, 2009 – September 17, 2013
- Network: NBC
- Release: May 20, 2012 – present
- Network: Esquire Network
- Release: May 26, 2014 – February 19, 2017

Related
- American Ninja Challenge

American Ninja Warrior, sometimes abbreviated as ANW, is an American sports entertainment and reality game show competition program based on the Japanese television reality show Sasuke, which also serves as a successor of American Ninja Challenge. It features a set of obstacle courses in various cities, which competitors attempt to conquer. The obstacle courses are divided into Qualifiers courses, Semifinals courses, and a four-part Finals course which is based at the Las Vegas Strip (sometimes called Mount Midoriyama). The competitor who finishes all the courses in the fastest time wins a cash prize of $1,000,000. Starting with season 10, if one remaining competitor fails on any of Finals course parts but has completed it more than the others in the fastest time, they win a consolatory $100,000 prize. The show is hosted by Matt Iseman (the show's moderator) and Akbar Gbaja-Biamila. To date, only three competitors have won the main cash prize: Isaac Caldiero, Drew Drechsel, and Vance Walker (who is the only competitor to do it twice). Furthermore, Geoff Britten, Daniel Gil, and Caleb Bergstrom are the only three runners-up who have achieved Total Victory.

The series premiered on December 12, 2009, on cable channel G4. For the first three seasons, the show only screened a single qualifying and semifinals course while the top contestants travelled to Japan to compete at the Sasuke seasons' finals course. In 2012, the modern format began with multiple qualifying and semifinals courses in several cities, a fixed Finals course in Las Vegas, and now regularly airing on NBC. In 2020, following COVID-19 restrictions, the show abolished the usual format and filmed a shorter season in St. Louis studio with no live audience. Production for the 13th season reverted to the previous format, although with fewer filming locations.

On February 3, 2025, it was announced that American Ninja Warrior had been renewed for a seventeenth season, and premiered in June 2025. On August 4, 2025, it was announced that American Ninja Warrior had been renewed for an eighteenth season, which premiered on June 8, 2026.

== History ==
In late 2006, the American cable channel G4 began airing broadcasts of the Japanese sports entertainment television special Sasuke (subtitled or dubbed in English and re-titled Ninja Warrior). Coinciding with this, the channel held the first American Ninja Challenge, in which Americans gained the opportunity to be sent to compete on Sasuke. Over time, the semi-annual Sasuke broadcasts on G4 gained a cult following in the United States and eventually almost became the channel's most-watched broadcasts. This led to the creation of the American adaptation of the show, American Ninja Warrior, in 2009. American Ninja Warrior followed American Ninja Challenge as the qualifying route for Americans to enter Sasuke.

Since the fourth season, American finalists compete on a nearly-identical finals course on the Las Vegas Strip instead of traveling to Japan to compete on Sasuke. NBC began broadcasting the city finals and national finals episodes in the fourth season.

By the fifth season, G4 was set to be replaced by Esquire Network and had wound down all original programming except American Ninja Warrior by January 2013. Notably, the sideboard advertising along the fifth season's courses listed Esquire Network as the broadcaster because G4 was going to transition into Esquire Network by April 22, 2013—before the season premiere. However, the channel switch was delayed to September 23, 2013, and Esquire Network took over Style Network's channel space instead. As a result, NBC became the sole broadcaster of the original episodes while Esquire Network aired reruns until the eighth season.

== Format ==
=== Competitors ===
Before being eligible to compete, all competitors must first meet several requirements. There is no maximum age limit, but the minimum has consistently been lowered. For the first 9 seasons, it was 21, then in season 10 it was lowered to 19 for the next 3 seasons. Starting with season 13, specific teenagers from 15 are invited to the show as specific guests, while the minimum age lowered to 15 years was officially regulated in season 15. Competitors must fill out a 20-question questionnaire and make a video about themselves which would be displayed on the show before their runs. Video length requirements have varied from two to eight minutes, depending on the season (currently two to three minutes). Some of the competitors may be given more screen time, with full run and background shown; other runs may be shown briefly or edited out of the episode. Producer Anthony Storm said that the screen time is divided between athletes based on their performance, story originality, and the amount of competitions they have already participated in before.

About 1,000 people applied to compete in the first season, 3,500 in the fifth season, 5,000 in the sixth season, 50,000 in the seventh season, 70,000 in the eighth season, and 77,000 in the ninth season. Producers then select 100 competitors from the applicants to participate in each qualifier. Until season 11, applicants could also camp outside a qualifying course and wait days or weeks to be one of the 10-30 participants selected as walk-ons. Beginning in Season 11, a lottery system was instituted to randomly select 15-20 walk-ons per qualifier.

=== Obstacles ===
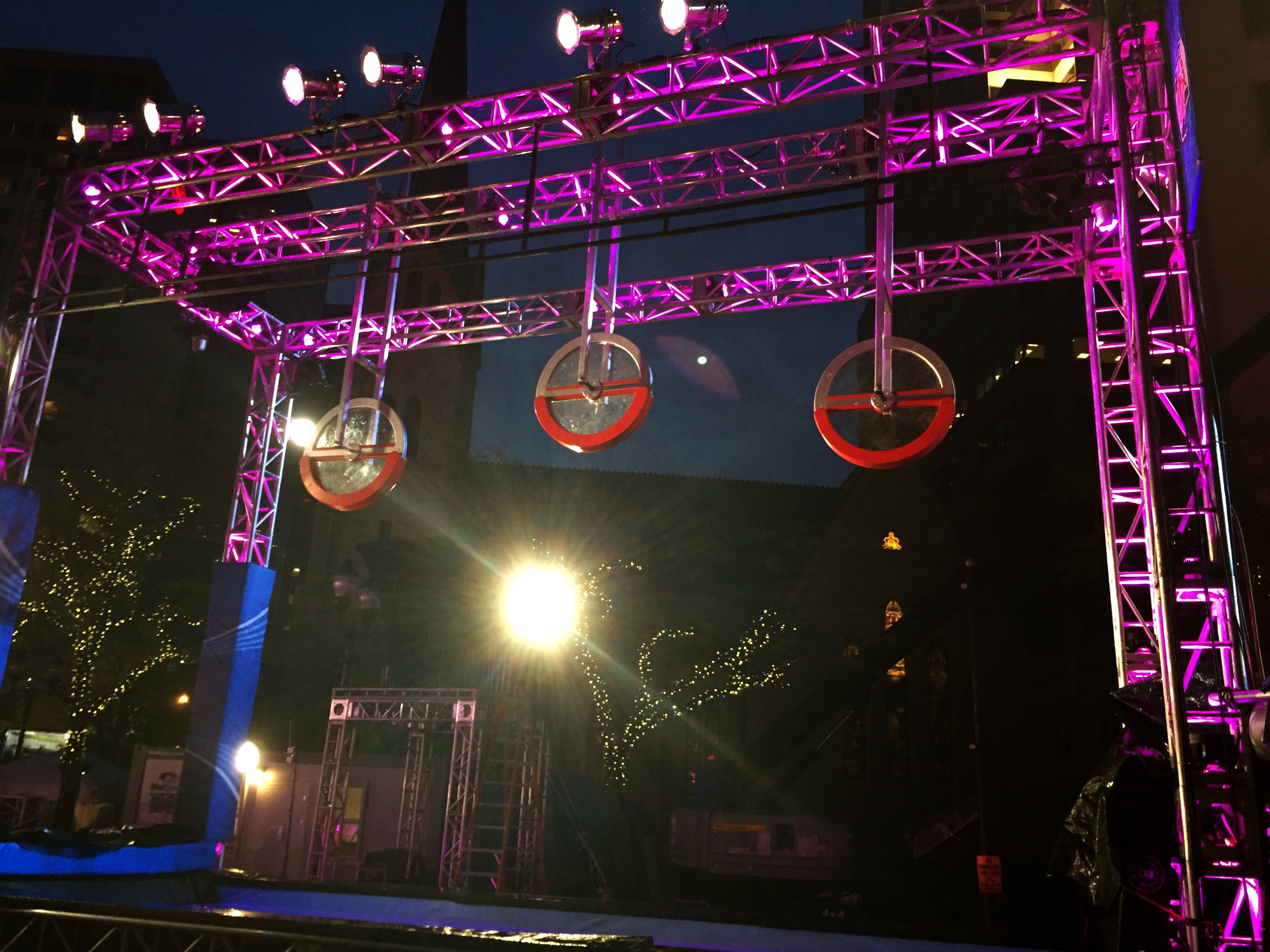
The eighth season's obstacle Fly Wheels. Here, competitors can only use the red hemispheres to cross the obstacle.

The episode's obstacles are designed and produced five months prior to an episode taping, usually from fall to winter. They share similar visual appearance and colors: the red or blue plastic inserts are installed into suspensory metal constructions and mark the pathway through the obstacle. A pool of water is located beneath every obstacle, though some in earlier seasons had mats instead. If a competitor touches water at any time, their run ends. The producers may make adjustments to the obstacles to change their difficulty between competitions, but not during opened events. The competitors do not see and have no option to practice on the obstacle courses before their run, but are given instructions on the approach to them. By and large, the goal is to make 10 to 15% of competitors complete a single obstacle course.

In the fourth season, each location contained one or two obstacles that differed between others. Since the fifth season, three to all five obstacles have differed. In the tenth season, the show's first underwater obstacle was introduced during Stage 2 of the National Finals. Since the 12th season, some obstacles changed in appearance to look more vibrant after there was no need to change locations of events. Starting with season 13, contestants got to choose between two obstacles to complete on some occasions in qualifiers and semifinals called Split Decision. It has been considered a psychological challenge for the contestants and also a way to save up energy before next obstacles. The amount of new obstacles per season is regulated by NBC.

Beginning with the ninth season, fans of the show have been given the opportunity to design their own obstacles through the ANW Obstacle Design Challenge.

=== Qualifiers ===
In each qualifying course, the competitors that have been selected compete on the first obstacle course which consists of six obstacles. Usually, the first and the third obstacles test the competitor's balance skills while the others are oriented on the upper body. However, since the 15th season, the first obstacle is reconsidered as an upper body one.

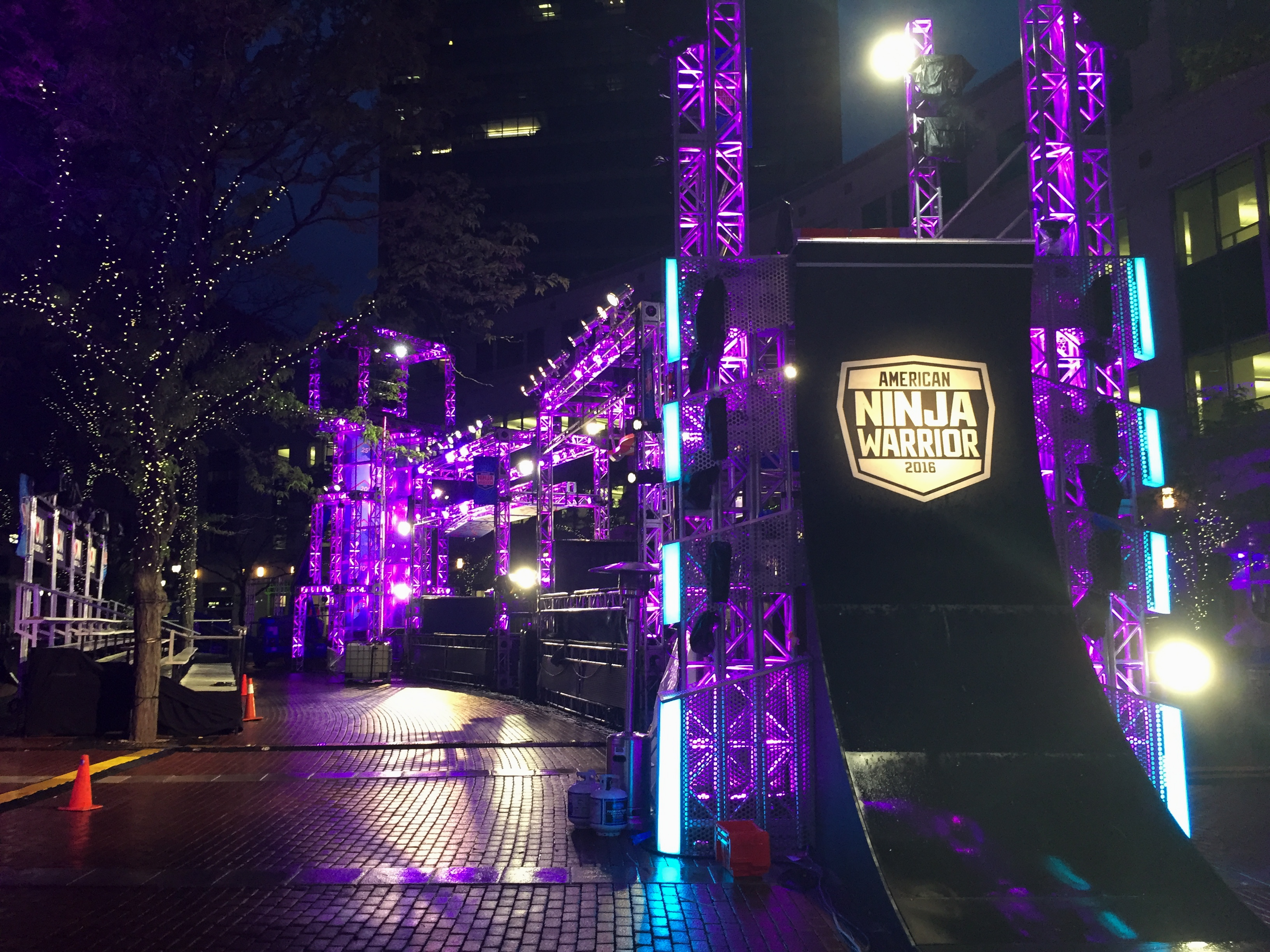
The final obstacle of all city qualifying courses, the Warped Wall, seen in Indianapolis.

The Warped Wall serves as a sixth and final obstacle on every qualifiers course, while the competitors have three chances to complete it. In the first 7 seasons, the wall reached a total height of 14 ft. In the 8th and 9th seasons, it was increased to 14'6". In the 10th season, the 18-foot "Mega Wall" was introduced adjacent to the Warped Wall. Competitors had only one attempt to reach the top of the Mega Wall and, if successful, they won $10,000. In the 11th season, competitors were given the choice of which to climb; if they chose the Mega Wall, those who failed on their first attempt could earn $5,000 on their second attempt and $2,500 on their third if successful. From seasons 12 to 14, the structure of the Mega Wall returned to the season 10 rules. Starting with the 15th season, the Mega Wall was elevated to 18'6" and could only be attempted if competitors complete the course in under 1:20.00.

At the top of both walls, a competitor presses a buzzer that stops the timer and records their time, ending their run on the course. The top 30 competitors who go the farthest in the least time advance to the city finals course. Since the fifth season, competitors who complete the qualifiers automatically move on to the semifinals. Since the ninth season, the top five women also advance to the semifinals, even if they have not finished in the top 30. In the 15th season, the leaderboards for men and women have divided into top 13 men and top 5 women.

Starting with season 15, a new qualifying segment, The Runoffs, was introduced. After all contestants of the night run their courses, the two competitors of men and women who finish outside of automatic semifinal spot compete against each other on a course of four obstacles introduced in previous seasons. The competitor who goes farther or faster than their opponent advances to semifinals, while the second runner is eliminated.

From season 4 to 11, the qualifiers were called City Qualifiers and were held in various cities around the United States. However, after the shutdown of the series due to COVID-19 pandemic, all city qualifiers were suspended, while filming for the twelfth season was entirely held in St. Louis, while the current format of qualifiers was established and later implemented in future seasons. All qualifiers are now held in a single predetermined city, and the show covers all the contestants' expenses, including travel costs and accommodation. Showrunner Anthony Storm said that there is a chance that the series will return to the old model of qualifiers.

=== Semifinals ===
The semifinal courses are the follow-up to each qualifying course. They contain four new obstacles in addition to the six obstacles featured in the city qualifying course. These four obstacles are all placed after the original six obstacles. In the tenth season, two of the original six obstacles are replaced with new obstacles for the city finals course. The change was dropped in the next season, but a season later, all the original obstacles except the first and the Warped Wall were decided to be switched. There is no opportunity to run the Mega Wall and receive $10,000. The extra set of obstacles mostly centers on the contestant's upper body skills.

The top 15 or 12 competitors who go the farthest in the least time from each city finals course move on to compete on the National Finals course. Since the fifth season, competitors who complete the city finals automatically move on to the National Finals. Since the ninth season, the top two women in each city finals course also move on to compete on the National Finals course, even if they do not finish in the top 15 or 12. Previously, many women had been granted wildcard slots, which allowed them to advance to the National Finals. Since the 8th season, small prizes ranging from $1,000 to $5,000 are awarded to first, second, and third finishers who complete the city finals course.

Since the eleventh season, a new segment called Power Tower was introduced as an expansion to the semifinal course. The top two competitors would race against each other on a standalone course containing several obstacles simultaneously. The first who presses the buzzer on top of the Power Tower wins a Safety Pass, which allows one to retry a single National Finals course if needed.

Starting with season 15, a new format was introduced to the semifinals. Now, instead of competing on an extended course, pairs of competitors will race against each other. The winners of head-to-head races and two losers who went faster and farther than others proceed to the National Finals. However, all competitors who complete the semifinals automatically move on to the National Finals in Vegas.

For the first eleven seasons, the semifinals were called City Finals and were held after City Qualifiers in the same city and with the same competitors. In the first three seasons, there also was a semi-final course in between the City Finals and the National Finals courses, where the top 15 competitors from the City Finals course were narrowed down to 10 and then sent to Japan to compete on Sasuke. In the second and third seasons, this was referred to as "boot camp" and took place at a summer camp in Simi Valley, California. During this time, competitors trained together for multiple days and took part in pressure challenges. With the expansion of the series in its fourth season, there was no longer a need to narrow down competitors to 10, as they were no longer being sent to Japan, and this semi-finals course was removed. They were filmed back-to-back with city qualifiers over two nights. The City Finals were replaced with the current semifinal format in season 12 due to COVID-19 restrictions along with other show changes. Now, all semifinal courses are held at a lot in Universal Studios in Los Angeles. By contrast with City Finals, the number of semifinal nights is less than the qualifiers.

=== National Finals ===
In the first three seasons, the top 10 competitors from the semi-final advanced to a Sasuke finals course in Japan. Since season four (except for season 12, 17 and 18), the show has its own finals course on the Las Vegas Strip known as "Mount Midoriyama". The National Finals course consists of four stages, each containing obstacles of increasing difficulty. The course is about the same size as four football fields and contains 22 or 24 obstacles.

Stage 1 consists of eight obstacles, which test the competitors' agility and speed. The first stage is timed, and only the competitors who successfully complete it within 2:45 advance to Stage 2. Since season 15, it is not necessary to finish the course, but only the top 24 competitors will advance to Stage 2, independent of the number of finishers, a format similar to qualifier courses.

For seasons 4 to 14, Stage 2 contained six obstacles that test competitors' strength and speed. Competitors must complete the course within a time limit in order to advance to Stage 3. The time limit through the first nine seasons was 4:00. In the tenth season, the time limit was increased by 30 seconds. After the stage, all unused Safety Passes expire and can be no longer used in further stages. Starting with the 15th season, Stage 2 resembles the Semifinals format, where contestants race head to head, with 12 winners and 2 best losers (determined by additional head-to-head races among the 4 losers) advancing to Stage 3.

Stage 3 consists of seven (eight until season 11) obstacles that test competitors' upper body and grip strength. It is the only stage in the National Finals that has no time limit. Like Stages 1 and 2, only the competitors who successfully complete Stage 3 move on to compete in Stage 4. Starting in Season 10, Stage 3 has a clock that counts up to determine any tiebreaking times should no contestant advance from Stage 3, since the format guarantees prize money to the contestant that advances the furthest on the course, and the tiebreaker is based on how fast the contestants reached the previous obstacle prior to failing.

Stage 4 consists of a single obstacle, the Rope Climb, which is the final obstacle of the National Finals courses. Contestants must complete this rope climb in 30 seconds or less in order to be crowned as "American Ninja Warrior". The rope climb's height was 50 feet from the first through three seasons, and was increased to 65 feet in season 4. It has been increased since to 75 feet. From the 2nd through 7th seasons, the fastest competitor to beat the final stage would receive the full prize money, regardless of whether other competitors completed Stage 4 as well. Beginning with the eighth season, if multiple competitors completed Stage 4, the competitors split the prize money.

For season 17 and 18, the National Finals utilizes head-to-head racing in a single-elimination tournament bracket, with the winner receiving $250,000, rather than $1 million.

=== Presenters ===
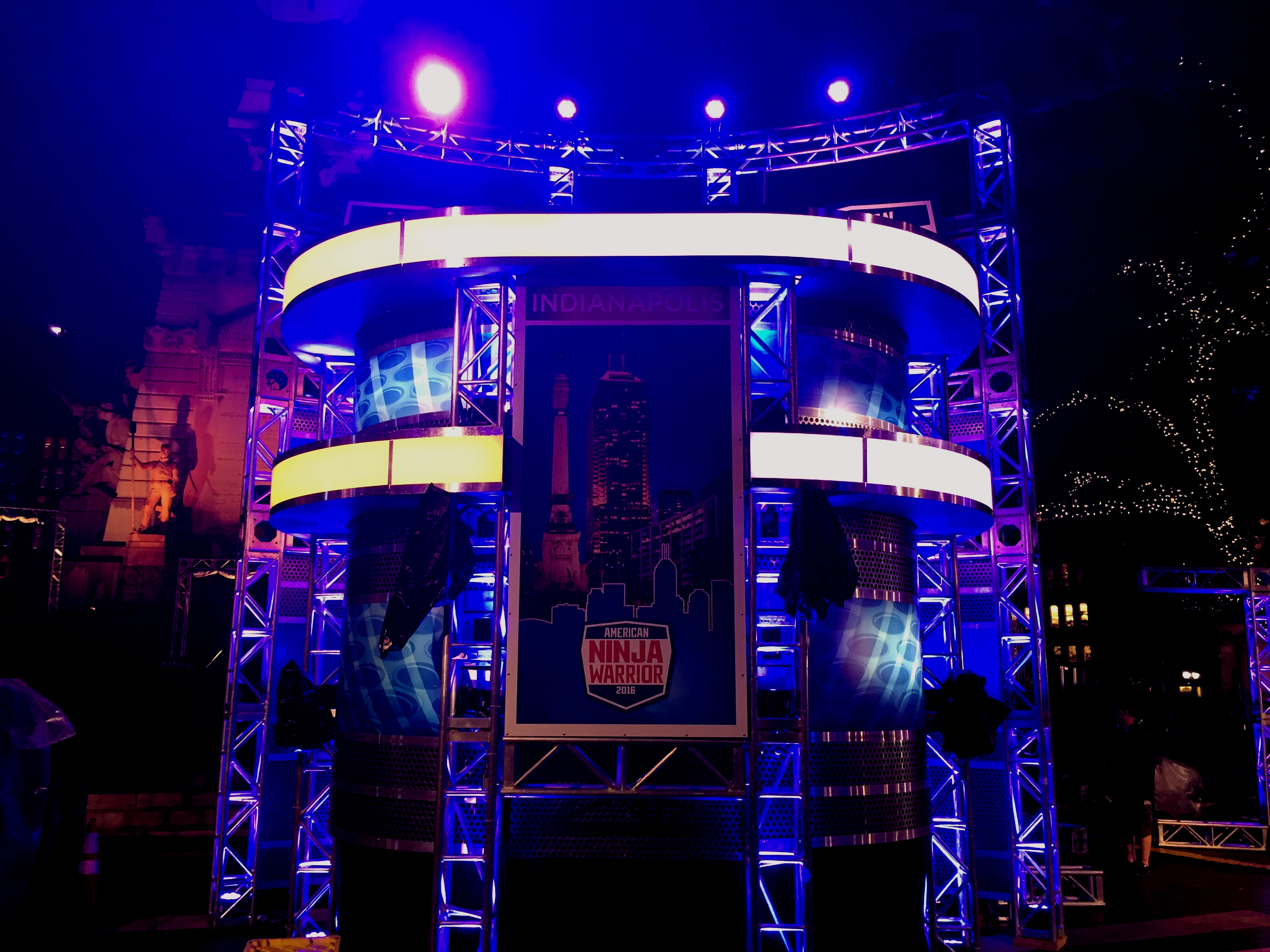
The broadcast position for host Matt Iseman and co-host Akbar Gbajabiamila, seen here in the eighth season alongside a city course

During each episode, the play-by-play announcer and color commentator provide remarks on a competitor's run on the course while the sideline reporter introduces the obstacles during the beginning of the episode and interviews competitors. The commentators usually oversee not the whole course, instead they see the middle of the course and track the beginning and the end of the course via monitors.

The series was originally hosted by G4's Blair Herter and Alison Haislip. In the second season, comedian and television host Matt Iseman joined the show, replacing Herter. Producers were fond of his knowledge of sports and lighthearted, enthusiastic delivery; he is also known by his pronunciation of the show's title. Additionally, MMA fighter Jimmy Smith was brought in as co-host while Haislip was assigned to the new sideline reporter position. The panel remained the same throughout season three.

For season four, Olympic medalist Jonny Moseley was brought in as the new color commentator, replacing Smith. Producers believed his experience as a freestyle skier would bring a unique perspective to the series. Meanwhile, sportscaster and television presenter Angela Sun replaced Haislip.

For season five, two newcomers were introduced. Sports analyst and former NFL player Akbar Gbajabiamila replaced Moseley, while ESPN sportscaster and model Jenn Brown replaced Sun as sideline reporter. Gbajabiamila was contacted to audition for the role of co-host in Los Angeles after being seen on the NFL Network by one of the series' executive producers. The panel remained the same for the next season.

For season seven, CBS Sports reporter Kristine Leahy joined the show as the new sideline reporter, replacing Brown, and remained on the show through season 10. For the eleventh season, Access Hollywood and E! News correspondent Zuri Hall was appointed as new sideline reporter, replacing Leahy. Since then, the panel has remained the same.

The presenters' booth is located on the course behind the Warped Wall. Usually, the presenters would see only the middle of a curved obstacle course, and would watch the beginning and the end of the runs via monitors.

== Series overview ==
S.	Duration		Ep.	National Finals					Presenters		
S.	Premiere	Finale	Ep.	Winner's prize (Total Victory)	Last Ninja Standing prize	Venue	Winners	Result	Commentators		Sideline reporter
1	December 12, 2009	December 19, 2009	8	None	None	Sasuke 23 (Japan)	Levi Meeuwenberg	Failed Stage 3	Blair Herter	Alison Haislip	None
2	December 8, 2010	December 23, 2010	10	$250,000	None	Sasuke 26 (Japan)	David Campbell	Failed Stage 3	Matt Iseman	Jimmy Smith	Alison Haislip
3	July 31, 2011	August 21, 2011	10	$500,000	None	Sasuke 27 (Japan)	David Campbell	Failed Stage 3	Matt Iseman	Jimmy Smith	Alison Haislip
4	May 20, 2012	July 23, 2012	24	$500,000	None	Las Vegas	Brent Steffensen	Failed Stage 3	Matt Iseman	Jonny Moseley	Angela Sun
5	June 30, 2013	September 16, 2013	21	$500,000	None	Las Vegas	Brian Arnold	Failed Stage 3	Matt Iseman	Akbar Gbaja-Biamila	Jenn Brown
6	May 26, 2014	September 8, 2014	15	$500,000	None	Las Vegas	Joe Moravsky	Failed Stage 3	Matt Iseman	Akbar Gbaja-Biamila	Jenn Brown
7	May 25, 2015	September 14, 2015	18	$1,000,000	None	Las Vegas	Isaac Caldiero	Achieved Total Victory (Note: Geoff Britten and Isaac Caldiero achieved Total Victory, while Caldiero won the $1,000,000 grand prize.)	Matt Iseman	Akbar Gbaja-Biamila	Kristine Leahy
8	June 1, 2016	September 12, 2016	15	$1,000,000	None	Las Vegas	Drew Drechsel	Failed Stage 3	Matt Iseman	Akbar Gbaja-Biamila	Kristine Leahy
9	June 12, 2017	September 18, 2017	18	$1,000,000	None	Las Vegas	Joe Moravsky	Failed Stage 3	Matt Iseman	Akbar Gbaja-Biamila	Kristine Leahy
10	May 30, 2018	September 10, 2018	18	$1,000,000	$100,000	Las Vegas	Drew Drechsel	Failed Stage 3	Matt Iseman	Akbar Gbaja-Biamila	Kristine Leahy
11	May 29, 2019	September 16, 2019	18	$1,000,000	$100,000	Las Vegas	Drew Drechsel	Achieved Total Victory	Matt Iseman	Akbar Gbaja-Biamila	Zuri Hall
12	September 7, 2020	November 6, 2020	9	$100,000	None	St. Louis	Daniel Gil	Won Power Tower Playoff	Matt Iseman	Akbar Gbaja-Biamila	Zuri Hall
13	May 31, 2021	September 13, 2021	15	$1,000,000	$100,000	Las Vegas	Kaden Lebsack	Failed Stage 4	Matt Iseman	Akbar Gbaja-Biamila	Zuri Hall
14	June 6, 2022	August 29, 2022	14	$1,000,000	$100,000	Las Vegas	Kaden Lebsack	Failed Stage 4	Matt Iseman	Akbar Gbaja-Biamila	Zuri Hall
15	June 5, 2023	September 11, 2023	14	$1,000,000	$100,000	Las Vegas	Vance Walker	Achieved Total Victory (Note: Daniel Gil (season 15), Vance Walker (seasons 15 and 16), and Caleb Bergstorm (season 16) achieved Total Victory, while Walker won the $1,000,000 grand prize in both seasons.)	Matt Iseman	Akbar Gbaja-Biamila	Zuri Hall
16	June 3, 2024	September 9, 2024	13	$1,000,000	$100,000	Las Vegas	Vance Walker	Achieved Total Victory	Matt Iseman	Akbar Gbaja-Biamila	Zuri Hall
17	June 2, 2025	August 25, 2025	13	$250,000	None	Las Vegas	Kai Beckstrand	Won Knockout Stage	Matt Iseman	Akbar Gbaja-Biamila	Zuri Hall
18	June 8, 2026	August 31, 2026	13	$250,000	None	Las Vegas	Josiah Pippel	Won Knockout Stage	Matt Iseman	Akbar Gbaja-Biamila	Zuri Hall

Indicates champions who received winner's prize.

== Seasons overview ==
=== 2009–2011 ===
The first season of American Ninja Warrior began production in July 2009. The season premiered on December 12, 2009, on G4, and concluded on December 19, 2009. It consisted of 8 30 minute episodes. The qualifying and semifinals rounds took place in Venice Beach, where a tryout was opened, meaning competitors from across the United States had to fly themselves there to compete. Levi Meeuwenberg was the Last Man Standing, having gone the farthest in the least time among the American competitors on Sasuke 23.

The second season premiered on December 8, 2010, on G4, and concluded on December 23, 2010, after 10 hour-long episodes. Qualifying and semifinals were held in Venice Beach in August. Out of the 10 competitors sent to Japan to compete on Sasuke 26, five completed Stage 1, four completed Stage 2, while none completed Stage 3. David Campbell was the Last Man Standing, having been the American gone the farthest in the least time on Stage 3.

The third season had the same format as the second season but aired in the summer. Qualifying and semifinals were held in Venice Beach in May. It premiered on July 31, 2011, on G4, and concluded on August 21, 2011. The finale was aired again on August 22, 2011, as a two-hour primetime special on NBC. In addition to the 10 Americans sent to compete on Sasuke, one fan of ANW got the chance to compete as well. This was the result of an eBay auction in which proceeds were sent to the American Red Cross to help with recovery efforts following the 2011 Tōhoku earthquake and tsunami in Japan. During Sasuke 27, four of the six competitors who reached Stage 3 were American—a new record. Previously, only one American would reach Stage 3 per Sasuke competition. David Campbell was again the Last Man Standing, having gone the farthest in the least time among the American competitors on Stage 3.

=== 2012–2015 ===
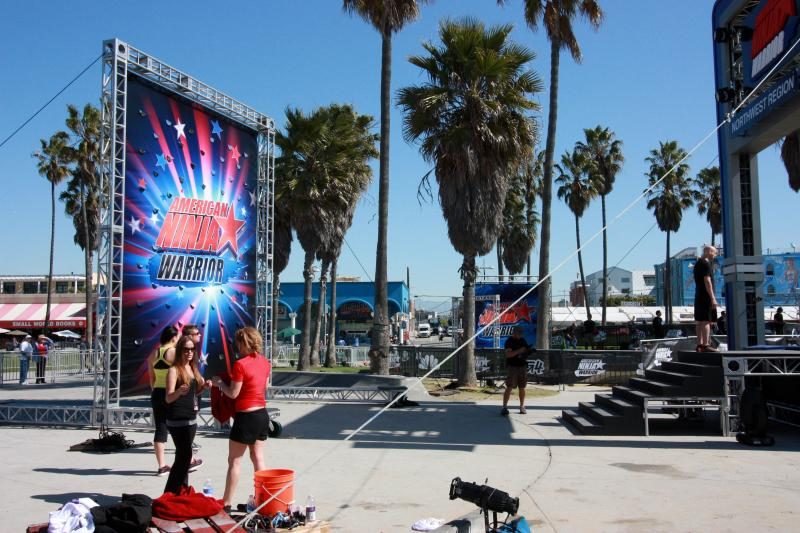
Filming at the entrance of the course at Venice Beach during the fourth season

The fourth season was notable for differentiating American Ninja Warrior from Sasuke. Following the ratings success of the third season's NBC primetime special, the fourth season aired on both G4 and NBC. It premiered on May 20, 2012, on G4, and concluded on July 23, 2012, on NBC. Regional qualifying was aired on G4, while the regional finals courses aired on NBC. With an increased production budget, preliminary rounds were held in three locations across the United States. Six regional competitions took place in Venice Beach, Dallas, and Miami. During the National Finals, which were held for the first time in Las Vegas, Brent Steffensen was the only competitor to reach Stage 3 and became the Last Man Standing. He went further on Stage 3 than any American had ever gone before, including on Sasuke.

The fifth season premiered on June 30, 2013, on G4, and concluded on September 16, 2013, on NBC. City qualifying and finals courses aired on both G4 and NBC. City competitions were held in four cities. During a qualifying round, Jessie Graff became the first woman to qualify for a city finals course. During the National Finals, 41-year-old Joyce Shahboz became the first woman to compete there twice in two years, while Brian Arnold fell on the final obstacle of Stage 3 and won the title of Last Man Standing.

The sixth season premiered on May 26, 2014, and concluded on September 8, 2014, with original episodes airing solely on NBC. During qualifiers, Kacy Catanzaro became the first female competitor to make it up the Warped Wall. Later in the city finals, she became the first woman to complete a city finals course. Catanzaro's two runs have been described as the first "viral moment" of the show and are credited with increasing the seventh season's submissions ten times over. During the National Finals, Joe Moravsky fell on the third from the last obstacle of Stage 3 and became the sixth season's Last Man Standing.

The seventh season premiered on May 25, 2015, and ended on September 14, 2015. A special military edition was held in front of the USS Iowa in San Pedro for competitors who are either current or former members of the U.S. Armed Forces in addition to five base locations. During the National Finals, a record of 38 competitors completed Stage 1, and 8 athletes completed Stage 2, and both Isaac Caldiero and Geoff Britten completed Stage 3, marking the first time any competitor completed it in the regular season. During Stage 4, Britten completed the rope climb in 0:29.65 seconds, becoming the first American Ninja Warrior and the first runner-up to achieve Total Victory for being the first competitor to complete all six courses (city qualifying, city finals, and all four stages of Mount Midoriyama) in a single season, while Caldiero completed the rope climb in 0:26.14 seconds, earning the trophy and the $1,000,000 prize due to him having the fastest time, therefore becoming the second American Ninja Warrior and the first champion.

=== 2016–2019 ===
The eighth season of the series began on June 1, 2016, and concluded on September 12, 2016. The eighth season marked a 40 percent increase in the number of female submission videos from the previous season. During the finals in Philadelphia, no competitor completed the course for the first time in the series' history. During National Finals, Jessie Graff became the first woman to complete Stage 1. However, only 17 competitors advanced to Stage 2, marking the lowest number in the series' history. Only two of them, Drew Drechsel and Daniel Gil, managed to beat Stage 2, but none of them completed Stage 3. Drechsel fell further on the course and was declared the Last Man Standing.

The ninth season premiered on June 12, 2017, and ended on September 18, 2017. A record of 41 competitors successfully completed Stage 1 during the National Finals, while Allyssa Beird became the second woman to complete it. Stage 2 saw every competitor eliminated except for three veterans. However, none of them could complete Stage 3. Joe Moravsky fell on the penultimate obstacle and became the Last Man Standing.

The tenth season began airing on May 30, 2018, and ended on September 10, 2018. For the first time in the show's history, a Last Ninja Standing prize of $100,000 was introduced. The first city qualifying, held in Los Angeles, was dedicated to the release of Jurassic World: Fallen Kingdom and featured cameo appearances of Chris Pratt and Bryce Dallas Howard. Drew Drechsel and Sean Bryan were the only competitors to reach Stage 3 of National Finals both fell during their runs. Drechsel and Bryan fell on the same obstacle, but the former made it faster to it, making him the Last Ninja Standing.

The eleventh season started its premiere on May 29, 2019, and ended on September 16, 2019. City competitions were held in six locations. One of them featured obstacles dedicated to the release of The Angry Birds Movie 2. New rules regarding the Mega Wall, which was introduced in the previous season, came into effect. Competitors were given three chances to make it up the wall, but the prize money decreased after each attempt, starting at $10,000, then decreasing to $5,000, and finally $2,500. During the National Finals, 28 of the 86 finalists completed Stage 1, and a record 21 athletes completed Stage 2. Drew Drechsel and Daniel Gil completed Stage 3. Gil was not able to complete the rope climb on Stage 4 in the 30-second time limit, but Drechsel was able to climb it in 0:27.46 seconds, earning him the $1,000,000 prize and becoming the third American Ninja Warrior and the second champion.

=== 2020–present ===
On January 22, 2020, the series was renewed for a twelfth season, which premiered on September 7, 2020. Qualifying cities originally included returns to Los Angeles and St. Louis with a new location, Washington, D.C., with the National Finals initially set to be held in Las Vegas. However, production of the season was postponed due to the COVID-19 pandemic, being interrupted in the middle of production on the show, a day before filming was set to begin. Instead, a reduced season, consisting of eight episodes only, returned to St. Louis and was fully filmed at The Dome at America's Center. ANW was the first NBC series to have completed a full season of episodes during the pandemic. The schedule for each episode changed multiple times, switching from one timeslot to another. For the first time, a Spanish-language version airs on Telemundo.

150 athletes, which were 50 notable contestants and two teammates for each one, participated in the season. The season finals course consisted of 10 obstacles, with top 8 contestants moving for a face-to-face knockout stage on the Power Tower. Daniel Gil won over Austin Gray in the final playoff stage and earned a reduced $100,000 prize.

Drew Drechsel, the winner of the previous season, was put under arrest with charges related to sexual misconduct on August 4, 2020, six days after filming of the season completed. NBC responded to his arrest by cutting ties with him and removing any mentions of him out of the season, including his appearance in special episodes. However, his two teammates were briefly shown. Per his teammates, Drechsel had not reached the Power Tower playoffs. At the moment of his arrest, his lawyer claimed Drechsel would plead "not guilty," but his case was terminated on June 1, 2023, when he signed a Waiver of An Indictment and entered an Application for Permission to Enter Plea of Guilty. On June 19, 2023, he officially pled guilty to one count of receiving child pornography and one count of knowingly persuading, inducing, enticing and coercing a minor to travel interstate to engage in sexual activity. On June 26, 2024, Drechsel was sentenced to 121 months in federal prison, 15 years of supervised release (along with registering as a sex offender), and was ordered to pay $100,000 in restitution to his victim.

The thirteenth season consists of 12 episodes aired from May 31 to September 13, 2021. For this season, several invitations to compete have been sent to teenagers from 15 to 19 years who made achievements in spin-off shows despite no official age lowering was announced. The season format had the filming of 5 qualifying episodes in the Tacoma Dome in Seattle/Tacoma, with the 4 semifinals taped at Universal Studios Hollywood in Los Angeles. The finals returned to its usual spot on the Las Vegas Strip. In the National Finals, Jesse Labreck became the third woman to complete Stage 1 of the regular season. Four contestants made it to Stage 3, two of whom were teenagers. 15-year old Kaden Lebsack was the only one to complete Stage 3, but timed out on Rope Climb and became Last Ninja Standing.

The fourteenth season consists of 12 episodes. The season format is similar to the previous season, but the filming of qualifying episodes was moved to the Alamodome in San Antonio. One of the qualifying nights included a Minion-themed balance obstacle dedicated to the release of Minions: The Rise of Gru. The qualifiers saw the record 10 people complete the Mega Wall, while 15-year-old Jordan Carr became the youngest to complete the Warped Wall. Five contestants have passed Stage 3 of the National Finals, but all of them failed to complete the Rope Climb in under 30 seconds; Kaden Lebsack became Last Ninja Standing for the second consecutive time.

The fifteenth season consists of 14 episodes. The season saw a few changes. First, competitors who ranked 12 and 13 (or 4 and 5 for women) raced for the final spot in a Runoff. Second, the semifinals were all races (seeded 1 vs 24, 1 vs 8). Third, the top 24 competitors would advance to Stage Two, regardless of completing the course. Fourth, Stage Two was just like the Semifinals with races, but the four fastest losers would compete in Runoffs. This guaranteed a minimum of 14 competitors would advance to Stage Three. Taylor Greene made history by hitting two buzzers in her first two runs. Also, she went farther than any women this season and being the youngest woman to do so at the age of fifteen. A record-breaking eight reached Stage 4. Only two completed the rope climb: Daniel Gil, who finished in 27.99 seconds and became the fourth American Ninja Warrior and the second runner-up to achieve Total Victory, and Vance Walker, who clocked in at 26.75 seconds, being the fifth American Ninja Warrior and the third champion.

The sixteenth season premiered on June 3, 2024. Five ninjas reached Stage 4. Only two completed the rope climb: Vance Walker, who finished in 27.60 seconds, being the first two-time American Ninja Warrior and champion, and Caleb Bergstrom, who finished in 28.90 seconds and became the sixth American Ninja Warrior and the third runner-up to achieve Total Victory.

The seventeenth season premiered on June 2, 2025. For the first time ever, the season is a nod to the past, present, and future of ANW. Some of the past competitors were invited to compete alongside the well-known competitors. Qualifying remained the same with six obstacles, and the semifinals was back to ten for the first time since season fourteen. For the first time ever, the tournament was a straight knockout elimination bracket on a head-to-head race course, featuring fan-favorite obstacles in ANW's history. The champion wins $250,000.

The eighteenth season premiered on June 8, 2026.

== Special episodes ==
=== USA vs. The World ===
Special		Air date	Champions	Runner-up	3rd Place	4th Place	Commentators	Sideline reporter
1	USA vs. Japan	January 13, 2014	Team USA	Team Japan	—N/a		Matt Iseman and Akbar Gbaja-Biamila	Jenn Brown
2	USA vs. The World	September 15, 2014	Team Europe	Team USA	Team Japan	—N/a	Matt Iseman and Akbar Gbaja-Biamila	Jenn Brown
3	USA vs. The World	January 31, 2016	Team USA	Team Europe	Team Japan	—N/a	Matt Iseman and Akbar Gbaja-Biamila	Kristine Leahy
4	USA vs. The World	June 4, 2017	Team USA	Team Europe	Team Latin America	—N/a	Matt Iseman and Akbar Gbaja-Biamila	Kristine Leahy
5	USA vs. The World	March 11, 2018	Team Europe	Team USA	Team Latin America	Team Asia	Matt Iseman and Akbar Gbaja-Biamila	Kristine Leahy
6	USA vs. The World	January 27, 2019	Team USA	Team Australia	Team Europe	—N/a	Matt Iseman and Akbar Gbaja-Biamila	Kristine Leahy
7	USA vs. The World	January 26, 2020	Team Australia	Team USA	Team Europe	—N/a	Matt Iseman and Akbar Gbaja-Biamila	Zuri Hall

NBC has aired seven international competitions in which the best ninjas of the season compete against teams from around the world, including Japan, Europe, Latin America, Asia, and Australia for the American Ninja Warrior: USA vs. The World trophy. They were usually filmed after the regular season of American Ninja Warrior finishes. The competitors race on the Las Vegas course used in the National Finals of the regular season. All of the international competitions have been hosted by the American variation's hosts and sideline reporters. The current title holders is Australia.

=== All Stars ===
Ten special episodes of the series were aired by NBC, in which the best ninjas overall compete in teams and individually. Team competitions include lineups of five or three athletes picked by the show's hosts running the National Finals stages individually or in relay races, with the winner determined on Stage 4 based on the number of points received or on Stage 3 based on the number of completed obstacles. In individual competitions, contestants try to complete oversized obstacles, increasing in length after each round, and remain in competition when their opponents fail. One of the specials, subtitled "All Star Spectacular", ditched team competitions and entirely focused on skills challenges.

An obstacle originated from the special episodes, Mega Wall, which is a supersized version of Warped Wall, was brought to the regular season as part of qualifier rounds. Its height reached 18'6 feet in the latest season, although in specials it could have been increased up to 19 feet.

Five of all-stars competitions, retitled Women's Championship, only included 12, 13, or 16 female competitors as they compete on two obstacle courses from qualifiers, semifinals, or National Finals. After each course they complete, they advance to a further round based on the leaderboard. After one or two rounds, the four or twelve remaining athletes proceed to a knockout stage, in which the winner earns a $50,000 prize.

== Awards and nominations ==
Year	Award	Category	Nominee	Nominated for	Result	Ref.
2015	2015 Kids' Choice Awards	Favorite Reality Show	American Ninja Warrior	Season 6	Nominated	
2016	42nd People's Choice Awards	Favorite Competition TV Show	American Ninja Warrior	Season 7	Nominated	
2016	68th Primetime Emmy Awards	Outstanding Competition Program	American Ninja Warrior	Season 7	Nominated	
2017	69th Primetime Emmy Awards	Outstanding Competition Program	American Ninja Warrior	Season 8	Nominated	
2017	2017 Kids' Choice Awards	Favorite Reality Show	American Ninja Warrior	Season 8	Nominated	
2017	43rd People's Choice Awards	Favorite Competition TV Show	American Ninja Warrior	Season 8	Nominated	
2017	Producers Guild of America Awards	Outstanding Producer of Competition Television	Production Team (Note: 28th Producers Guild of America Awards nominees for "Outstanding Producer of Competition Television": Arthur Smith, Kent Weed, Anthony Storm, Brian Richardson, Kristen Stabile, David Markus, J.D. Pruess, D. Max Poris, Zayna Abi-Hashim, Royce Toni, John Gunn, Matt Silverberg, Briana Vowels, Mason Funk, Jonathan Provost.)	Season 7, 8	Nominated	
2018	Producers Guild of America Awards	Outstanding Producer of Competition Television	Production Team (Note: The production team included Arthur Smith, Kent Weed, Anthony Storm, Brian Richardson, Kristen Stabile, David Markus, Royce Toni, Stephen Saylor, J.D. Pruess, Jeffrey J. Hyman, D. Max Poris, Briana Vowels, and Jonathan Provost.)	Season 9	Nominated	
2018	70th Primetime Creative Arts Emmy Awards	Outstanding Directing for a Reality Program	Patrick McManus	"Daytona Beach Qualifiers"	Nominated	
2018	70th Primetime Creative Arts Emmy Awards	Outstanding Picture Editing for a Structured or Competition Reality Program	Editing Team (Note: The editing team included Nick Gagnon, David Greene, Michael Kalbron, Corey Ziemniak, Curtis Pierce, Kyle Barr, Mary Dechambres, Matthew Probst, Scott Simmons, Martin Singer, Katherine Griffin and Flavyn Mendoza.)	"Daytona Beach Qualifiers"	Nominated	
2018	70th Primetime Emmy Awards	Outstanding Competition Program	American Ninja Warrior	Season 9	Nominated	
2019	71st Primetime Creative Arts Emmy Awards	Outstanding Directing for a Reality Program	Patrick McManus	"Minneapolis City Qualifiers"	Nominated	
2019	71st Primetime Emmy Awards	Outstanding Competition Program	American Ninja Warrior	Season 9	Nominated	
2019	71st Directors Guild of America Awards	Outstanding Directorial Achievement in Reality Programs	Patrick McManus	"Miami City Qualifiers"	Nominated	

== Broadcast ==
Season	Time slot (ET)	Episodes	Premiered		Ended		Channel/ Network	Season averages (NBC)	
Season	Time slot (ET)	Episodes	Date	Viewers (millions)	Date	Viewers (millions)	Channel/ Network	Viewers (millions)	18–49 rating
1	Saturday 6:00 pm	8	December 12, 2009	—N/a	December 19, 2009	—N/a	G4	N/A	N/A
2	Wednesday 8:00 pm	10	December 8, 2010	—N/a	December 23, 2010	—N/a	G4	N/A	N/A
3	Sunday 9:00 pm	10	July 31, 2011	0.38	August 21, 2011	0.25	G4	N/A	N/A
4	Monday 9:00 pm	24	May 20, 2012	0.34	July 23, 2012	4.87	G4; NBC	5.46	2.0
5	Monday 8:00 pm	22	June 30, 2013	5.04	September 16, 2013	4.04	G4; NBC	5.15	1.6
6	Monday 9:00 pm	15	May 26, 2014	4.65	September 8, 2014	5.21	NBC	5.33	1.8
7	Monday 8:00 pm	18	May 25, 2015	5.87	September 14, 2015	6.17	NBC	6.54	1.9
8	Monday 8:00 pm	15	June 1, 2016	6.35	September 12, 2016	5.88	NBC	6.28	1.8
9	Monday 8:00 pm	18	June 12, 2017	5.36	September 18, 2017	5.96	NBC	5.86	1.4
10	Monday 8:00 pm	18	May 30, 2018	5.35	September 10, 2018	5.69	NBC	5.08	1.1
11	Monday 8:00 pm	18	May 29, 2019	4.84	September 16, 2019	4.93	NBC	4.66	0.9
12	Irregular	9	September 7, 2020	3.66	November 6, 2020	2.97	NBC	3.02	0.5
13	Monday 8:00 pm	15	May 31, 2021	3.30	September 13, 2021	3.53	NBC	3.32	0.5
14	Monday 8:00 pm	14	June 6, 2022	3.13	August 29, 2022	3.14	NBC	2.86	0.4
15	Monday 8:00 pm	14	June 5, 2023	3.09	September 11, 2023	2.93	NBC	3.07	0.4
16	Monday 8:00 pm	13	June 3, 2024	2.80	September 9, 2024	2.51	NBC	2.71	0.3
17	Monday 8:00 pm	13	June 2, 2025	2.67	August 25, 2025	2.82	NBC	2.65	0.3
18	Monday 8:00 pm	13	June 8, 2026	1.66	August 31, 2026	3.08	NBC	2.30	0.3

=== International broadcasts ===
The show is in syndication markets throughout the U.S. and airs on local broadcast channels. At one point syndicated episodes were airing on MTV2 on Saturdays in August 2018. On August 12, 2019, the series began airing reruns on Nickelodeon. However, after airing just 10 episodes, the series was abruptly pulled from the schedule after August 23, 2019.

In Australia and New Zealand, the show is broadcast on SBS2 (2013–2017), 9Go! (2018–present), TV3 and Four. On April 25, 2016, it was announced that Canadian broadcaster CTV picked up American Ninja Warrior for its 2016 summer broadcast schedule. In the United Kingdom and Ireland, the show is broadcast on Challenge and more recently on Sky Two. In Israel, the show is broadcast on Yes Action with the American version, and on Keshet 12 with its own version. In 2016, Croatian RTL started broadcasting the show. The show is also shown in Finland on Sub-TV. In the Netherlands the show was first broadcast in 2017 on SBS6, where their own Ninja Warrior NL has been broadcast. In Norway it is broadcast on TV2 Zebra. The show also airs in South Africa, on SABC 3, airing Sunday afternoons 13:30.

== Video game ==
A sports video game based on the series, American Ninja Warrior: Challenge, was released in North America on March 19, 2019, for PlayStation 4, Xbox One, and Nintendo Switch. It was developed by Gaming Corps Austin and published by GameMill Entertainment.

== Spin-offs ==
=== Ninja vs. Ninja ===
On October 9, 2015, Esquire Network announced the first spin-off, which would feature 24 three-person teams (two men and one woman) of notable competitors, initially titled Team Ninja Warrior. The teams compete head-to-head against each other, running the course simultaneously, thus creating a new live duel dynamic (including crossing points, where the two competitors can affect the other's progress.) The two teams with the fastest times advance to the finale, where one team will be crowned the winner and receive a cash prize. Matt Iseman and Akbar Gbaja-Biamila returned as hosts alongside actor and journalist Alex Curry. The series was the channel's most-watched program in its history.

On May 31, 2016, Esquire Network ordered a sixteen-episode second season that also included a five-episode special college edition that had college students go head-to-head against rival schools. On March 6, 2017, it was announced that Team Ninja Warrior would be moving to sibling cable channel USA Network as Esquire Network winds down its linear channel operations and relaunches as an online only service. The show's second season premiered on April 18, 2017. A third season of the show, which was re-titled American Ninja Warrior: Ninja vs. Ninja, aired on USA Network from March 1 to June 18, 2018.

=== American Ninja Warrior Junior ===
On May 2, 2018, the second spin-off, entitled American Ninja Warrior Junior, was announced. The first season premiered on Universal Kids on October 13, 2018, Matt Iseman and Akbar Gbaja-Biamila reprised their roles from ANW as hosts, with Olympic 2016 gold medalist Laurie Hernandez joining as co-host, guiding competitors in head-to-head challenges. The series featured 142 kids aged 9–14 competing on a course of miniature obstacles similar to the ones introduced in the original series. Similar to ANW, males and females run along the same course, and similarly to Ninja vs. Ninja editions, competitors participate in head-to-head runs. They are divided into three age groups: 9–10, 11–12 and 13–14, with each category coached by AWN competitors and other athletes. For the second season, 2012 Paralympic gold and silver medalist Victoria Arlen replaced Hernandez as sideline reporter. In May 2021, it was announced that the third season would be moving to Peacock. It premiered on September 9, 2021, and ended on December 9, 2021.

The success of the spin-off made the producers consider the minimal age requirements to 15 years, as the young competitors would have to wait until they are nineteen in order to compete in the regular season. In the 13th and 14th seasons of the show, producers selected only the outstanding young competitors from the spin-off as "special guests" before it was fully enforced as regulars starting in 2023.

== See also ==
- World Ninja League
