= Zuri Hall =

American entertainer and actress (born 1988)

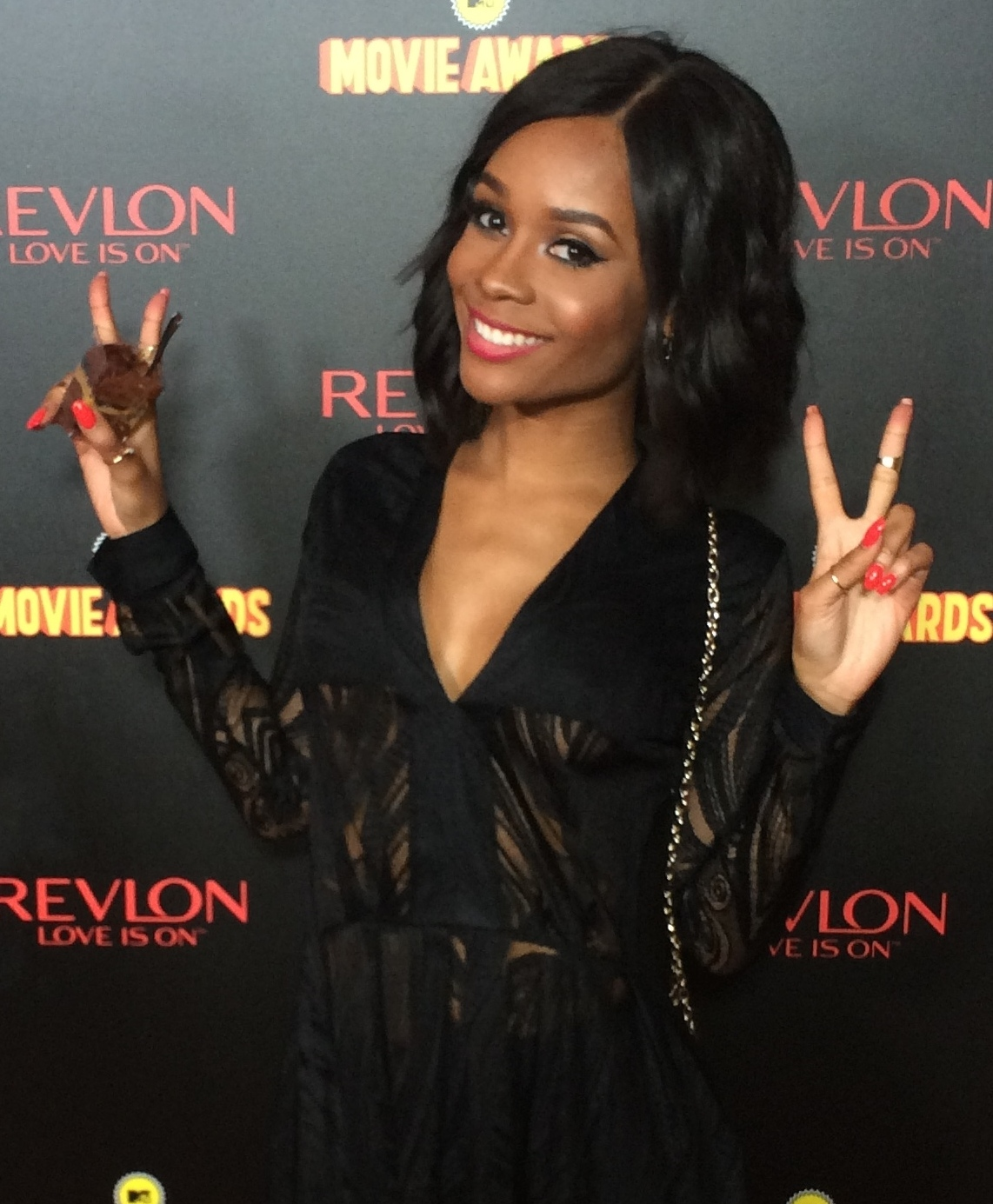
- Hall at the 2015 MTV Movie Awards
- Born: June 2, 1988 (age 38); Toledo, Ohio, U.S.
- Education: Ohio State University (BA)
- Occupations: Entertainment reporter; television personality; actress; producer; model
- Years active: 2009–present
- Website: zurihall.com

Zuri Hall (born June 2, 1988) is an American entertainment reporter, television personality, actress and producer. Hall served as co-host for Access Hollywood on NBC from 2019 until the series’s end in 2026. She is also the sideline reporter for NBC's primetime summer competition show American Ninja Warrior. Hall has hosted the beauty pageants Miss USA 2021, Miss USA 2022, Miss Universe 2022, Miss Universe 2023 and Miss Universe 2024.

== Early life ==
Hall was born on June 2, 1988 in Toledo, Ohio. Growing up, she became fascinated with the arts, more specifically with theatre. She graduated from Maumee Valley Country Day School in 2006. She graduated from Ohio State University in 2010 with a Bachelor of Arts in strategic communication. She was a four-year Morrill Scholar, earning a full academic scholarship to attend the college.

== Career ==
=== Entertainment broadcasting ===
Hall competed against hundreds in the search for the next Face of MyINDY-TV and became the first woman to win the position. At WNDY-TV in Indianapolis, she covered local events, starred in station PSAs, and interviewed celebrities. From December 2011 to December 2012, she was an on-camera host and producer of Living Dayton, a local, lifestyle talk show on WDTN in Dayton, Ohio. In the summer of 2012, she was featured as a guest correspondent on BET's 106 & Park.

She worked as an official MC for the Indiana Pacers' home games for the 2010-2011 and 2011-2012 NBA seasons. Hall previously emceed for the MiLB's Indianapolis Indians, the WNBA's Indiana Fever, and the 2011 Big Ten Tournament. She also served as the MC for the NCAA Women's Final Four entertainment events, and "Tourney Town" for three years - Indianapolis in 2011, Denver in 2012, and Nashville in 2013. Hall was also the official MC for the Super Bowl Village, a 10-day-long entertainment for Super Bowl XLVI, in Indianapolis in 2012. There, she kept crowds energized, entertained between performances and introduced national recording artists to the stage, including Patti LaBelle, LMFAO, and Mike Epps.

Hall anchored the evening news for CW33's 'Nightcap News' at KDAF-TV in Dallas, Texas for much of 2013, before moving to NYC to accept a position at FUSE TV. At FUSE TV, she co-hosted Trending 10, which was a live, daily countdown show. She has also been a recurring guest on VH1's Big Morning Buzz Live and has appeared on E!'s Fashion Police with Joan Rivers.

Until July 2015, Hall worked for MTV, where she hosted The Challenge: Battle of the Exes II's reunion and after-shows and various network specials. In the summer of 2015, Hall appeared alongside popular radio personality Charlamagne Tha God on his new MTV2 show, Uncommon Sense. In October 2015, she returned as The Challenge: Battle of the Bloodlines after-show host.

From 2015 to 2019, Hall was a fill-in anchor and daily correspondent for E! News. During her tenure, she hosted What's Good with Zuri Hall on Instagram and co-hosted What the Fashion on Snapchat. In October 2019, she joined NBC as a correspondent for Access Hollywood and a sideline reporter for American Ninja Warrior. She was also a co-host of their new show AllAccess, which focused on entertainment news, human interest & true crime stories.

Zuri has hosted Miss USA for the last two years; first for Miss USA 2021, returning to host again for Miss USA 2022

=== Acting ===
Hall started her on-camera career as a commercial actress. She has been featured in national spots for Value City Furniture, and commercials for Safe Auto, Meijer, and Ohio tourism. She has made numerous guest appearances on scripted television shows throughout her career. In 2019, she acted in a cameo opposite Jennifer Aniston, in Apple TV +'s "The Morning Show," and has made multiple appearances on TV Land's "Nobodies" (executive produced by Melissa McCarthy), "The Arrangement" on E!, and the digital comedic series "Hashtaggers". Hall studied Improv at The Upright Citizens Brigade, in New York City.

== Impact ==
Hall fronts the partnership between Access Hollywood and the Black & Missing Foundation — sitting down to exclusively interview authorities and the loved ones of missing people of color, to amplify their stories and highlight cold cases.

She was a panelist on Bravo's 2020 televised special "Race in America : Our Vote Counts" — where she discussed the power of the Black vote. Zuri gave the keynote speech for her hometown NAACP chapter's 2018 Freedom Fund banquet — emphasizing the importance of voting in midterm elections and personal economic empowerment.

Hall also participated in the Ad Council's 'Know Your Girls' campaign (in partnership with Susan G. Komen) to raise breast cancer awareness for Black women; including being a speaker at the BlogHer Health 2019 Summit.

Hall has been featured in numerous publications—including as Essence Magazine's October 2016 "It Girl" of the month (with Barack Obama and Michelle Obama on the cover), PAPER Magazine, O, The Oprah Magazine and numerous South African publications, including Sunday World and True Love magazine. She's also been featured in profile pieces for AXS TV, in Metromix Indy as a Local Celebrity, Ballers Block as a "game changer", AMPS Indy, and The Indianapolis Star.

== Other ventures ==
She also started a YouTube channel titled, "Hey Zuri Hall" where she talks about, "love life, and style for girls who hustle." Her channel has more than 100,000 subscribers, and has accumulated over 5 million total views. In November 2019, Hall launched her podcast. Zuri Hall's Hot Happy Mess in collaboration with iHeartRadio and Charlamagne Tha God's Black Effect Podcast Network. She also has a blog on her official website called #AlphaBabe.

In 2020, Hall was featured in the season 2 of Bravo TV's program Race in America, a roundtable with NBC members discussing the power of the black vote.

== Awards and nominations ==
One year after graduating from college, Hall won a Regional Emmy Award for Outstanding Host and Talent. In 2017, she earned a Daytime Emmy Award nomination for Outstanding Entertainment News Program as a part of E! News.
