= Warped wall =

Physical challenge in obstacle courses

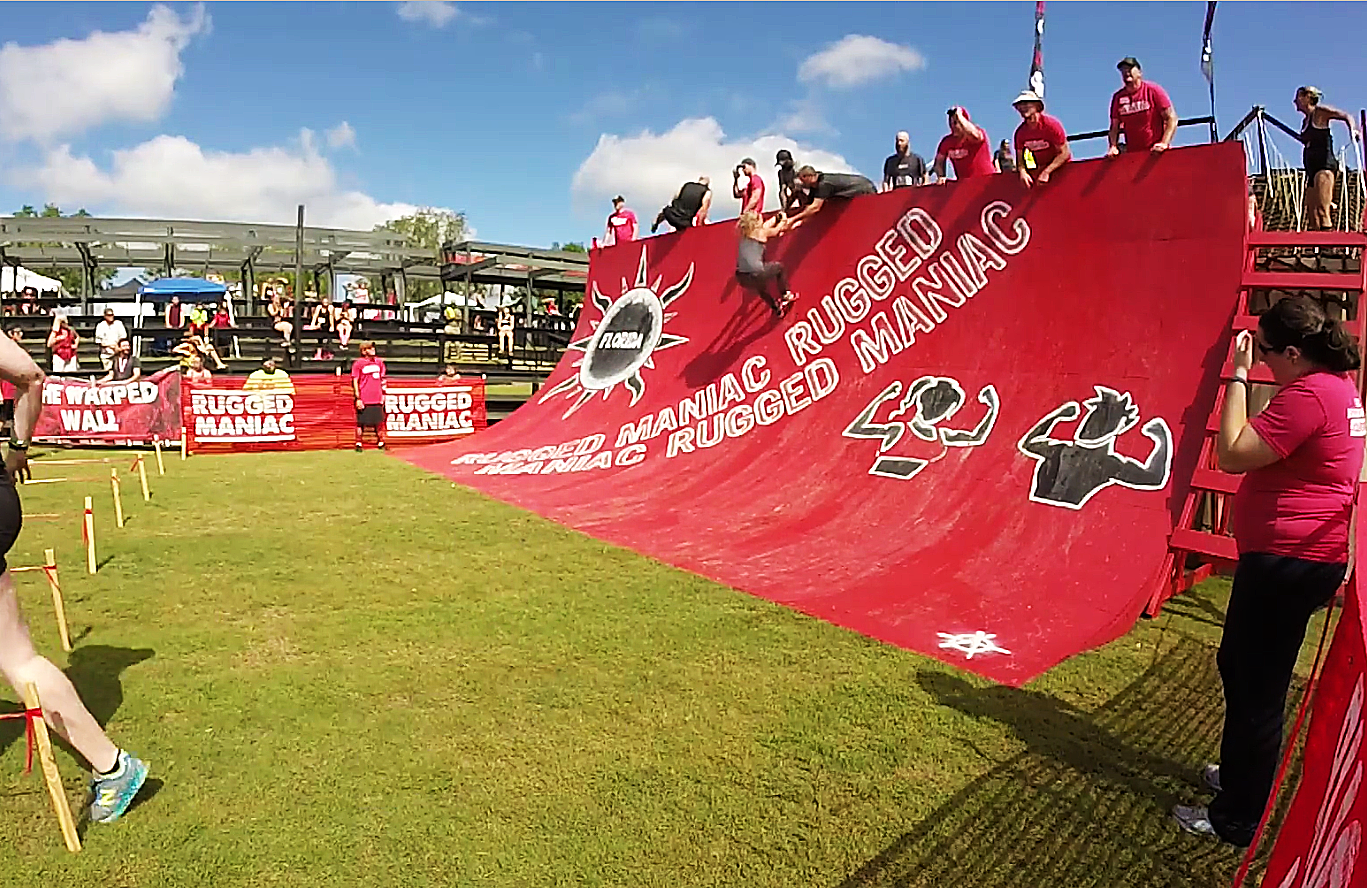
A warped wall at Rugged Maniac

The warped wall (Japanese: そり立つ壁, Hepburn: soritatsu kabe) is an obstacle on many obstacle courses for obstacle racing.

== Use ==
=== Ninjasport ===
The warped wall is used in various Ninja Warrior franchises, such as Sasuke, Kunoichi, American Ninja Warrior, Team Ninja Warrior, Ninja Warrior UK, Sasuke Ninja Warrior Indonesia, Australian Ninja Warrior, Ninja Warrior Germany and Sasuke Vietnam. The height of the warped wall varies depending on the competition. American Ninja Warrior used a 14 ft (4.3 m) warped wall for its first seven seasons, before switching to a 14.5 ft (4.4 m) wall in season 8. American Ninja Warrior also uses a "mega wall" for its all-star skills competition, where the height of the wall increases until no one can climb it. For its 2018 season 10, American Ninja Warrior introduced a 18 ft (5.5 m) "mega warped wall". If they are successful in climbing it, they would win $10,000. Competitors who chose the mega warped wall had only one attempt to reach the top. If unsuccessful, the competitor only got one shot at the warped wall. Those who did not wish to attempt the mega wall had three chances to reach the top of the warped wall. The mega wall will only be featured in the city qualifiers. In season 11, they had three attempts at both walls. The amount for making it up the warped wall decreased with every attempt, starting at $10,000 for the first, $5,000 for the second, and $2,500 for the third. In American Ninja Warrior Junior, the warped wall measures 13 feet (4.0 m), and will be completed at that height by the 13-14-year-olds. The unique wall is equipped with two pocket levels, which will provide assistance to the other age groups. 9-10-year-olds have a pocket at both 10 and 11.5 feet while 11-12-year-olds have a pocket only at 11.5 feet.

=== Obstacle racing ===
Several obstacle course races, including Rugged Maniac and Tough Mudder, have featured a similar wall albeit often with assistance available via ropes or teamwork. Some obstacle training gyms also offer a warped wall for practice.

=== Playgrounds and gyms ===
Many playgrounds and amusement gyms feature a Warped Wall. City Museum, a playground and museum consisting largely of repurposed architectural and industrial objects, housed in a former warehouse in St. Louis, includes a Warped Wall as well.

Many workout and training gyms feature a Warped Wall training station.

== Construction ==
The warped wall is a steeply curving tall wall obstacle with a short run-up, that the competitor must reach the top of and climb up.

Several manufacturers of warped walls exist to provide gyms and private individuals with this obstacle.

== Competition ==
=== Ninjasport ===
==== Women in American Ninja Warrior ====
On American Ninja Warrior, there have been fifty women who have scaled the Warped Wall in Seasons 6–18. During Season 11, Sandy Zimmerman became the first mom televised to climb the Warped Wall.

| Name | Season first completed |
|---|---|
| Kacy Catanzaro | Season 6 (Dallas Qualifying) |
| Michelle Warnky-Buurma | Season 6 (St. Louis Qualifying) |
| Meagan Martin | Season 6 (Denver Qualifying) |
| Jessie Graff | Season 7 (Venice Beach Finals) |
| Jesse Labreck | Season 8 (Philadelphia Finals) |
| Allyssa Beird McGrath | Season 9 (Cleveland Qualifying) |
| Rebekah Bonilla | Season 9 (Los Angeles Finals) |
| Barclay Stockett | Season 9 (San Antonio Finals) |
| Casey Rothschild | Season 10 (Philadelphia Qualifying) |
| Abby Clark | Season 10 (Minneapolis Qualifying) |
| Anna Shumaker | Season 10 (Los Angeles Finals) |
| Tiana Webberley | Season 10 (Los Angeles Finals) |
| Rachael Goldstein | Season 10 (Miami Finals) |
| Sandy Zimmerman | Season 11 (Seattle/Tacoma Qualifying) |
| Maggi Thorne | Season 11 (Oklahoma City Finals) |
| Taylor Amann | Season 11 (Oklahoma City Finals) |
| Karen Wiltin | Season 11 (Oklahoma City Finals) |
| Mady Howard | Season 11 (Seattle/Tacoma Finals) |
| Jeri D'Aurelio | Season 11 (Cincinnati Finals) |
| Ashley McConville-Bergstrom | Season 12 (St. Louis Qualifying Night 2) |
| Isabella Wakeham-Folsom | Season 13 (Los Angeles Semifinals Night 1) |
| Rachel Degutz | Season 13 (Los Angeles Semifinals Night 2) |
| Cara Poalillo Mack | Season 13 (Los Angeles Semifinals Night 2) |
| Megan Rowe | Season 13 (Los Angeles Semifinals Night 3) |
| Zhanique Lovett | Season 13 (Women's Championship 2) |
| Anabella Heinrichs | Season 13 (Family Championship) |
| Jordan Carr | Season 14 (San Antonio Qualifying Night 1) |
| Katie Bone | Season 14 (San Antonio Qualifying Night 4) |
| Brittney Durant | Season 14 (San Antonio Qualifying Night 5) |
| Karen Potts | Season 14 (Los Angeles Semifinals Night 3) |
| Addy Herman | Season 14 (Las Vegas National Finals Stage 1) |
| Taylor Greene | Season 15 (Los Angeles Qualifying Night 4) |
| Taylor Johnson | Season 15 (Women's Championship 4) |
| Emily Gardiner | Season 15 (Women's Championship 4) |
| Madelyn Madaras | Season 15 (Women's Championship 4) |
| Caitlyn Bergstrom-Wright | Season 17 (Las Vegas Semifinals Night 1) |
| Baylee Beckstrand | Season 17 (Las Vegas Semifinals Night 2) |
| Kenzie Hughes | Season 17 (Las Vegas Semifinals Night 3) |
| Payton Myler | Season 18 (Western Regional Finals) |
| Daniella Blanchard | Season 18 (Western Regional Finals) |
| Avery Glantz | Season 18 (Eastern Regional Qualifying Night 1) |
| Grace Gordon | Season 18 (Eastern Regional Qualifying Night 1) |
| Charlotte Barrett | Season 18 (Eastern Regional Finals) |
| Lily Barrett | Season 18 (Eastern Regional Finals) |
| Olivia Lopez | Season 18 (Eastern Regional Finals) |
| Akshara Pappu | Season 18 (Eastern Regional Finals) |
| Maggie Owen | Season 18 (Central Regional Qualifying Night 2) |
| KK Andrews | Season 18 (Central Regional Qualifying Night 2) |
| Anna McArthur | Season 18 (Central Regional Finals) |
| Jaleesa Himka | Season 18 (Central Regional Finals) |
