= American Ninja Warrior season 15 =

Season of American reality/sport competition television series American Ninja Warrior

American Ninja Warrior
- Season 15
- Hosted by: Matt Iseman; Akbar Gbaja-Biamila; Zuri Hall
- Finals venue: Mount Midoriyama (Las Vegas Strip)
- No. of episodes: 14

Release
- Original network: NBC
- Original release: June 5 – September 11, 2023

Season chronology
- ← Previous; Season 14 Next → Season 16

The fifteenth season of American Ninja Warrior premiered on June 5, 2023, on NBC. A spin-off from the Japanese reality series Sasuke, it is hosted by Matt Iseman, Akbar Gbaja-Biamila, and Zuri Hall. This season, both Qualifying and Semifinals were entirely held in Universal City in Los Angeles, while the National Finals returned to its usual spot in Las Vegas.

This season set a new record with 8 competitors all advancing to Stage 4, and also crowned the third grand prize winner in Vance Walker, who not only became the fifth ninja to achieve "Total Victory", but had previously won American Ninja Warrior Junior twice. In the same season, Daniel Gil became the fourth ninja to achieve total victory, but completed the rope climb slower than Walker.

The season was officially announced by NBC in late March 2023, though the applications were being accepted from November 19, 2022, until December 16, 2022. The full list of competitors was published on March 15, 2023. Filming for qualifiers moved to Los Angeles, California, where the semifinals remained. Filming for national finals remained in Las Vegas, Nevada.

Filming for the season began on March 15, 2023, and wrapped in early May 2023.

== Obstacles ==
The qualifying course starts from Pole Vault and ends on Warped Wall. For this season, to get one attempt for the Mega Wall, which was increased to 18.5 feet high, contestants must finish the course in less than 1 minute and 20 seconds; a contestant who completes the Mega Wall still gets an immediate reward of $10,000 (promoted by Wells Fargo). Standing next to the main course is a new segment, "The Runoffs", which replaces the Power Tower but follows the same structure: it features four obstacles, with two copies of them located alongside each other. The two male contestants and two female contestants in the last two places on the leaderboard run it side by side for the last spot in the semifinals.

In the semifinals, two contestants will run against each other, side-by-side, on the previously installed Runoffs course with Slingshot and Rope Climb added as a last two obstacles. At the end of the night, the two fastest finishers will run on a Safety Pass course, which replaces some of the obstacles from Semifinals with other ones. The winner receives a Safety Pass which allows for a do-over of stage 1 in the National Finals if he or she fails.

Denotes obstacles created by fans for the Obstacle Design Challenge.

=== Qualifying ===
Event	Obstacles						Finish under 1:20
Course 1	Pole Vault	Rollercoaster	Domino Effect	The Getaway	Lasso Launch	Warped Wall	Mega Wall
Course 2	Pole Vault	Greased Lightning	Domino Effect	The Getaway	Ring the Bells	Warped Wall	Mega Wall
Course 3	Pole Vault	Rollercoaster	Log Runner	Kite Surfer	Lasso Launch	Warped Wall	Mega Wall
Course 4	Pole Vault	Greased Lightning	Log Runner	Kite Surfer	The Cubes	Warped Wall	Mega Wall
Course 5	Pole Vault	Greased Lightning	Domino Effect	The Getaway	Ring the Bells	Warped Wall	Mega Wall
Course 6	Pole Vault	Rollercoaster	Domino Effect	The Getaway	Lasso Launch	Warped Wall	Mega Wall
Course 7	Pole Vault	Rollercoaster	Log Runner	Kite Surfer	Lasso Launch	Warped Wall	Mega Wall
Course 8	Pole Vault	Greased Lightning	Log Runner	Kite Surfer	Mutant Mayhem (Note: A modified version of The Cubes)	Warped Wall	Mega Wall

==== Runoffs ====
Event	Obstacles			
Course 1	Home Run	Spring Forward	Beehive	Hopscotch
Course 2	Home Run	Spring Forward	Beehive	Hopscotch
Course 3	Home Run	Flying Shelf Grab	Beehive	Sideways
Course 4	Home Run	Flying Shelf Grab	Beehive	Sideways
Course 5	Home Run	Spring Forward	Beehive	Hopscotch
Course 6	Home Run	Spring Forward	Beehive	Hopscotch
Course 7	Home Run	Flying Shelf Grab	Beehive	Sideways
Course 8	Home Run	Flying Shelf Grab	Beehive	Sideways

=== Semifinals ===
Event	Obstacles					
Course 1	Home Run	Spring Forward	Beehive	Hopscotch	Slingshot	Rope Climb
Course 2	Home Run	Spring Forward	Beehive	Hopscotch	Slingshot	Rope Climb
Course 3	Home Run	Flying Shelf Grab	Beehive	Sideways	Slingshot	Rope Climb
Course 4	Home Run	Flying Shelf Grab	Beehive	Sideways	Slingshot	Rope Climb

==== Safety Pass Race ====
Event	Obstacles					
Course 1	Home Run	Flying Shelf Grab	Wingnuts	Sideways	Spin Hopper	Rope Climb
Course 2	Home Run	Flying Shelf Grab	Wingnuts	Sideways	Spin Hopper	Rope Climb
Course 3	Home Run	Flying Shelf Grab	Beehive	Sideways	Slingshot	Rope Climb
Course 4	Home Run	Flying Shelf Grab	Beehive	Sideways	Slingshot	Rope Climb

=== National Finals ===
Stage	Obstacles									Time Limit
Stage 1	Slide Surfer	Three Ring Circus	Giant Rollercoaster	Jumping Spider	The Gambler	Warped Wall	Dipping Birds	Thread the Needle	Cargo Net	2:50
Stage 2	Striding Steps	Double Salmon Ladder	Jawbreakers	Swing Surfer	Epic Air Surfer	Falling Shelves				
Stage 3	Patriot Pass	Stalactites	Slam Dunk	Ultimate Cliffhanger	Pipe Dream	Pressure Cooker	Road Signs			
Stage 4	Rope Climb									:30

== Qualifying ==
The eight qualifiers, divided into seven nights, took place on the lot of Universal Studios Hollywood in Los Angeles, California. In a major change from past seasons, the number of semifinalists has been reduced, and men and women have completely separate leaderboards. The top 11 men and top 3 women advance to the semifinals immediately, while the next two men (12th/13th place) and the next two women (4th/5th place) compete head-to-head in "The Runoffs" for the final spots.

Denotes expanded course (Mega Wall) finishes
Denotes runoff winners who advanced to semifinals
Denotes rookie contestants

=== Course 1 ===
The first night of qualifying featured two rounds that were held in order. 5 competitors completed Course 1; only two of the competitors managed to finish the course faster than 1 minute and 20 seconds, but neither were able to successfully scale the Mega Wall. In the runoffs, Ramcis Valdez beat Alan Connealy (who made his first appearance since season 9) for the last men's spot, while Taylor Johnson beat Avery Glantz for the last women's spot. New obstacles included the Pole Vault, The Getaway, Lasso Launch, and Home Run in the runoff course. In an emotional moment, Brian Kretsch (who is one of only two competitors to appear in every single season) once again fell on a balance obstacle in the qualifying course (in this case, Domino Effect), and in his post-run interview, he hinted at a possible retirement from competition, citing his continued inability to clear balance obstacles.

Top 13 Men
Rank	Competitor	Time	Furthest Obstacle
1	Luke Dillon	01:18.68	Finished
2	Noah Meunier	01:19.91	Finished
3	Jay Lewis	01:24.09	Finished
4	James McGrath	01:33.06	Finished
5	Kevin Rodriguez	01:39.79	Finished
6	Najee Richardson	00:40.32	Lasso Launch
7	Evan Andrews	00:40.77	Lasso Launch
8	Mazeiah Andrade	01:03.50	Lasso Launch
9	Noah Jones	01:07.03	Lasso Launch
10	Verdale Benson	01:15.15	Lasso Launch
11	Evan Bomengen	01:41.85	Lasso Launch
12	Alan Connealy	00:15.70	Domino Effect
13	Ramcis Valdez	00:17.05	Domino Effect

Top 5 Women
Rank	Competitor	Time	Furthest Obstacle
1	Addy Herman	01:00.23	Lasso Launch
2	Casey Rothschild	01:07.24	Lasso Launch
3	Emily Gardiner	01:31.73	Lasso Launch
4	Taylor Johnson	01:35.35	Lasso Launch
5	Avery Glantz	00:32.20	Domino Effect

=== Course 2 ===
Course 2 occurred on the same night as the first qualifying, with 6 competitors finishing it. Top men's finisher Kai Beckstrand became the first competitor to complete this season's taller Mega Wall, and second-place finisher Jera Boyd was the other Mega Wall finisher. In the runoffs, Glenn Albright beat Steven Bachta for the last men's spot, while Jaelyn Bennett beat Larissa Cottle for the last women's spot. New obstacles in the qualifying course included Greased Lightning and Ring the Bells.

Top 13 Men
Rank	Competitor	Time	Furthest Obstacle
1	Kai Beckstrand	00:54.80	Finished + Mega Wall
2	Jera Boyd	01:19.97	Finished + Mega Wall
3	Hans Hertz	01:28.17	Finished
4	Cam Baumgartner	01:31.81	Finished
5	Austin Gray	01:44.88	Finished
6	Mike Silenzi	01:58.50	Finished
7	Nate Hansen	00:52.56	Ring the Bells
8	Brian Beckstrand	01:21.98	Ring the Bells
9	Roo Yori	01:33.17	Ring the Bells
10	Tatsumi Yanaba	01:47.14	Ring the Bells
11	Josh Ferguson	00:23.34	Domino Effect
12	Steven Bachta	00:23.61	Domino Effect
13	Glenn Albright	00:03.81	Greased Lightning

Top 5 Women
Rank	Competitor	Time	Furthest Obstacle
1	Emily Keener	01:02.15	Ring the Bells
2	Mady Howard	01:20.15	Ring the Bells
3	Violet Kepo'o	02:16.26	Ring the Bells
4	Larissa Cottle	01:11.40	The Getaway
5	Jaelyn Bennett	00:05.00	Greased Lightning

=== Course 3 ===
Only two competitors completed Course 3. Daniel Gil, who returned after missing the previous season, took the top time for the men and cleared the Mega Wall. In the runoffs, Gary Weiland beat James Thorwart for the last men's spot after completing the balance obstacle and became the first amputee ever to move on to the semi-finals. The qualifying course introduced another new obstacle, Kite Surfer.

Top 13 Men
Rank	Competitor	Time	Furthest Obstacle
1	Daniel Gil	01:15.91	Finished + Mega Wall
2	Jody Avila	02:05.03	Finished
3	Isaiah Thomas	01:17.08	Finished
4	Joseph Rouse	01:10.20	Lasso Launch
5	Isaiah Wakeham	01:24.90	Lasso Launch
6	Grant Kiningham	01:25.76	Lasso Launch
7	Ian Dory	01:28.55	Lasso Launch
8	Grant McCartney	01:56.92	Lasso Launch
9	Simba Jones	00:48.00	Kite Surfer
10	Elijah Levée	00:56.63	Kite Surfer
11	Deion Butler	01:18.03	Kite Surfer
12	Gary Weiland	02:23.50	Kite Surfer
13	James Thorwart	00:23.07	Log Runner

Top 5 Women
Rank	Competitor	Time	Furthest Obstacle
1	Isabella Wakeham	01:28.19	Lasso Launch
2	Madelyn Madaras	01:31.17	Lasso Launch
3	Cailin Jewell	00:37.92	Log Runner
4	Sandy Zimmerman	00:38.50	Log Runner
5	Lindsey Darling	00:04.38	Rollercoaster

=== Course 4 ===
Four competitors finished Course 4, but neither of the two who cleared it faster than 1 minute and 20 seconds managed to scale the Mega Wall. Jessie Graff returned again, and for the first time, her mother, 71-year-old Ginny MacColl, also competed (and ultimately failed the second obstacle, Greased Lightning). Brothers Nacssa and Roberto Garemore, who first appeared on American Ninja Warrior Junior, made their main ANW debuts and both advanced to the semi-finals. Firefighter Brandon Mears, one half of the duo called the "Towers of Power", returned after missing last season and announced that he would be making his final run on the course, but ultimately failed on Greased Lightning. This course introduced another new obstacle called The Cubes.

Top 13 Men
Rank	Competitor	Time	Furthest Obstacle
1	R.J. Roman	01:06.55	Finished
2	David Bergstrom-Wright	01:19.45	Finished
3	Elijah Browning	01:35.34	Finished
4	Nacssa Garemore	01:40.03	Clear
5	Vinnie Castranova	00:43.94	The Cubes
6	Brandon Thomas	00:47.33	The Cubes
7	Austin Hair	00:49.05	The Cubes
8	Johnny Brown	00:26.46	Kite Surfer
9	Roberto Garemore	00:28.73	Kite Surfer
10	D.C. Banks	00:29.39	Kite Surfer
11	Josh Heman-Ackah	00:34.21	Kite Surfer
12	Jason Grossman	00:40.43	Kite Surfer
13	Nyjle Henry	00:02.27	Greased Lightning

Top 5 Women
Rank	Competitor	Time	Furthest Obstacle
1	Jessie Graff	01:52.30	The Cubes
2	Caitlyn Bergstrom-Wright	01:52.73	The Cubes
3	Jeri D'Aurelio	00:03.50	Greased Lightning
4	Jaleesa Himka	00:03.64	Greased Lightning
5	Amelia Leonardi	—N/a	Greased Lightning

=== Course 5 ===
Course 5 was finished by 5 competitors; of those that cleared, only reigning two-time champion (Last Ninja Standing both times) Kaden Lebsack, cleared the course fast enough to try the Mega Wall, but failed to scale it. Former American Ninja Warrior Junior contestant Taylor Greene competed on the main course for the first time after turning 15 and became the first and only woman to clear the qualifying course this season. Two veterans, Jackson Twait and Donovan Metoyer, tried to run the course speedily to get a chance to try the Mega Wall, but both failed with the latter being eliminated after he fell on Domino Effect.

Top 13 Men
Rank	Competitor	Time	Furthest Obstacle
1	Kaden Lebsack	01:16.83	Finished
2	Barry Boyd	01:42.21	Finished
3	Max Feinberg	01:46.60	Finished
4	Scott Behrends	02:03.93	Finished
5	Tyler Yamauchi	01:45.06	Warped Wall
6	Jackson Twait	00:46.03	Ring the Bells
7	Ben Behrends	00:58.16	Ring the Bells
8	Derrick Pavoni	00:58.39	Ring the Bells
9	Chris DiGangi	01:09.63	Ring the Bells
10	Cade Perkins	01:22.08	Ring the Bells
11	Jawon Turner	01:49.43	Ring the Bells
12	Drew Marinelli	00:33.94	The Getaway
13	James Wilson	00:37.58	The Getaway

Top 5 Women
Rank	Competitor	Time	Furthest Obstacle
1	Taylor Greene	02:28.40	Finished
2	Maggie Owen	01:44.80	Ring the Bells
3	Riley Porter	00:03.77	Greased Lightning
4	Ally Tippetts Wooton	00:03.85	Greased Lightning
5	Kyndal McKenzie	—N/a	Greased Lightning

=== Course 6 ===
Course 6 was completed by 3 competitors. Sean Bryan took the fastest time and was the only competitor to clear the course fast enough to try the Mega Wall, but his attempt to scale it was ultimately unsuccessful. David Campbell competed again to keep his status as one of only two competitors to appear in every season of the show alive and once again managed to qualify for the semi-finals. Other notable competitors included West Side Story visual effects designer Daniel Novarro, who received encouragement from two of the film's stars, Rachel Zegler and Josh Rivera, before the start of his run (Novarro was ultimately defeated in the runoffs by police officer John Uga), and veteran Nate Tackett, who advanced to the semi-finals after receiving encouragement from his cousin, legendary country music singer Crystal Gayle.

Top 13 Men
Rank	Competitor	Time	Furthest Obstacle
1	Sean Bryan	01:05:92	Finished
2	Josiah Pippel	01:22.45	Finished
3	Jonathan Godbout	01:40.65	Finished
4	Joe Moravsky	00:35.88	Lasso Launch
5	Matt D'Amico	00:40.47	Lasso Launch
6	David Campbell	00:54.59	Lasso Launch
7	Ibrahim Hayek	00:59.09	Lasso Launch
8	Austin Baron	01:35.46	Lasso Launch
9	Alex Goodwin	00:21.04	The Getaway
10	Jamie Rahn	00:21.61	The Getaway
11	Nate Tackett	00:27.33	The Getaway
12	John Uga	00:28.94	The Getaway
13	Daniel Novarro	00:21.51	Domino Effect

Top 5 Women
Rank	Competitor	Time	Furthest Obstacle
1	Abby Clark	01:35.92	Lasso Launch
2	Rachel Degutz	01:51.77	Lasso Launch
3	Michelle Warnky Buurma	00:28.21	Domino Effect
4	Amy Harski	00:04.17	Rollercoaster
5	Brittney Durant	00:05.22	Rollercoaster

=== Course 7 ===
Course 7 was completed by only two competitors, with two-time American Ninja Warrior Junior champion Vance Walker taking the top time after failing to hit a single buzzer in the previous season. Abel Gonzalez returned and once again managed to advance to the semi-finals, as did two of his students, Sebastian Chrismer and Erick Zamorano, the latter advancing by way of his win in the runoffs. 15-year-old rookie Hunter Ogden made it as far as the fifth obstacle, Lasso Launch, but injured himself on the third obstacle, Log Runner, and despite finishing in the top 8, could not continue on to the semi-finals due to his injury. Erick Zamorano was originally on the leaderboard as 15th place but since Hunter Ogden and Michael Neuman withdrew, Zamorano was able to squeeze into the runoffs.

Top 13 Men
Rank	Competitor	Time	Furthest Obstacle
1	Vance Walker	01:32.79	Finished
2	Benjamin Drake	01:55.45	Finished
3	Cal Plohoros	00:44.46	Lasso Launch
4	Kyle Soderman	00:52.21	Lasso Launch
5	Karsten Williams	01:12.33	Lasso Launch
6	Sebastian Chrismer	01:14.92	Lasso Launch
7	Jonathan Bange	01:22.22	Lasso Launch
8	Abel Gonzalez	02:23.43	Lasso Launch
9	~~Hunter Ogden~~	???	Lasso Launch
10	Nick Hanson	00:29.85	Kite Surfer
11	Sylas Snider	00:31.65	Kite Surfer
12	Forest Strick	00:36.97	Kite Surfer
13	Andrey Collins	00:47.36	Kite Surfer
14	~~Michael Neuman~~	???	Kite Surfer
15	Erick Zamorano	00:26.43	Log Runner

Top 5 Women
Rank	Competitor	Time	Furthest Obstacle
1	Clarisa Morris	01:40.21	Lasso Launch
2	Rachel Brown	02:17.92	Lasso Launch
3	Barclay Stockett	02:33.37	Lasso Launch
4	Anna McArthur	00:51.93	Kite Surfer
5	Rachel Beth Drake	00:59.33	Kite Surfer

=== Course 8 ===
Course 8 saw 7 competitors clearing, with Caleb Bergstrom becoming only the 4th competitor of the season to scale the Mega Wall successfully, but for the first time in five weeks, and earn $10,000. The fifth obstacle, The Cubes, returned to the course, though it was referred to in this episode as Mutant Mayhem, with the water below it dyed green, both done to promote the 2023 film Teenage Mutant Ninja Turtles: Mutant Mayhem.

Top 13 Men
Rank	Competitor	Time	Furthest Obstacle
1	Caleb Bergstrom	01:15.37	Finished + Mega Wall
2	Alex Romer	01:16.75	Finished
3	Ethan Bartnicki	01:20.96	Finished
4	Flip Rodriguez	01:37.57	Finished
5	Enzo DeFerrari Wilson	01:38.39	Finished
6	Ryan Stratis	01:53.41	Finished
7	Brett Sims	02:28.25	Finished
8	Bob Reese	00:41.27	Mutant Mayhem
9	Isaiah Lee	01:11.84	Mutant Mayhem
10	Kyle Schulze	01:20.10	Mutant Mayhem
11	Matt Kalanz	00:32.59	Kite Surfer
12	Daniel Osmer	00:33.21	Kite Surfer
13	Kevin Tirado	—N/a	Kite Surfer

Top 5 Women
Rank	Competitor	Time	Furthest Obstacle
1	Zhanique Lovett	01:21.91	Mutant Mayhem
2	Ashley Bergstrom	—N/a	Mutant Mayhem
3	Emma Pereyra	00:40.36	Kite Surfer
4	Dara DePoalo	00:03.61	Greased Lightning
5	Esperanza Abarca	—N/a	Greased Lightning

== Semifinals ==
Rounds formed
Semifinal	Qualifying
1	2 & 5
2	1 & 6
3	3 & 7
4	4 & 8

The four semifinal rounds, divided over three nights, were taped at the same Universal Studios lot where the qualifiers were filmed during three nights. This season, a new format was introduced to the semifinals in which competitors race head-to-head in pairs. They are seeded based on the overall results in the leaderboard table which is created by merging 2 leaderboards from qualifying courses with the same obstacles. During the races, all the winners and the two losers who reached the farthest obstacle in the least amount of time advanced to the National Finals, unless more than two losers finished the semi-final course, by which case they all advance with the third fastest and slower going there as reserves. Meanwhile, the two fastest winners proceed to a modified head-to-head course at the end of each night where they race for a Safety Pass, an option for a second attempt on Stage 1 of the finals.

Denotes losers also advancing to National Finals
Denotes Safety Pass winners runs

=== Semifinal 1 ===
On the first night of the semifinals, Taylor Greene became the first woman rookie to complete two straight obstacle courses and the only woman of the night to hit a buzzer. Two father-son duos, the Behrends and Beckstrands, attempted to advance to the National Finals together for the first time in the show's history. While Kai Beckstrand finished the course in under a minute, but his father, Brian Beckstrand, was eliminated by Max Feinberg, the Behrends: Scott and Ben Behrends both won their races to become the first father-son duo to advance together. Kai later lost to two-time reigning Last Ninja Standing Kaden Lebsack in the Safety Pass race at night's end. Notable veterans not advancing to the National Finals are Chris DiGangi and Roo Yori, who failed to make the finals for the third and sixth straight time. Professional wrestler Baron Corbin briefly joined Matt and Akbar in the broadcast booth as a guest analyst.

Race results
Winners			Losers		
Time	Result	Competitor	Competitor	Result	Time
0:57.76	7. Completed	Kai Beckstrand	James Wilson	3. Beehive	No result
1:18.26	7. Completed	Kaden Lebsack	Glenn Albright	4. Hopscotch	No result
1:19.61	7. Completed	Jera Boyd	Josh Ferguson	4. Hopscotch	No result
1:31.25	7. Completed	Austin Gray	Cade Perkins	5. Slingshot	0:56.09
1:31.96	7. Completed	Jackson Twait	Nate Hansen	5. Slingshot	0:51.89
1:36.49	7. Completed	Hans Hertz	Jawon Turner	5. Slingshot	No result
1:39.00	7. Completed	Max Feinberg	Brian Beckstrand	5. Slingshot	No result
1:49.99	7. Completed	Barry Boyd	Roo Yori	4. Hopscotch	No result
1:58.39	7. Completed	Cam Baumgartner	Tatsumi Yanaba	4. Hopscotch	No result
2:13.89	7. Completed	Mike Silenzi	Chris DiGangi	5. Slingshot	0:58.12
2:19.44	7. Completed	Taylor Greene	Jaelyn Bennett	2. Spring Forward	No result
0:48.27	5. Slingshot	Ben Behrends	Tyler Yamauchi	5. Slingshot	0:49.24
0:51.75	5. Slingshot	Scott Behrends	Derrick Pavoni	5. Slingshot	No result
0:54.07	5. Slingshot	Emily Keener	Riley Porter	4. Hopscotch	No result
1:04.58	5. Slingshot	Maggie Owen	Violet Kepo'o	5. Slingshot	No result
1:10.33	5. Slingshot	Mady Howard	Ally Tippets Wooton	5. Slingshot	No result

=== Semifinal 2 ===
On the second night of the semifinals, season 14 finalist Josiah Pippel faced rookie Noah Meunier in the Safety Pass race, which Meunier ultimately won when both of them fell on Sideways after a video replay, as Meunier finished the previous obstacle less than a second before Pippel did. Abby Clark and Rachel Degutz, two of the "Jersey Girlz", faced each other in one of the races; Degutz won and was the only woman to complete the course, in the process also hitting her first-ever buzzer. Veterans Joe Moravsky, Najee Richardson, and James McGrath won their races against teenagers (with McGrath making his first trip to the National Finals since season 10) while other veterans lost theirs and were eliminated. David Campbell, who has competed in every season of the show, took the course at his own pace instead of racing and managed to advance to the National Finals as the fastest race loser after he finished it a minute later than his idol, Evan Andrews. Though he qualified for Vegas by winning his race, veteran Sean Bryan chose to withdraw after completing Hopscotch due to feeling pain in his arm.

Race results
Winners			Losers		
Time	Result	Competitor	Competitor	Result	Time
1:03.75	7. Completed	Josiah Pippel	John Uga	4. Hopscotch	2.11.86
1:07.16	7. Completed	Noah Meunier	Nate Tackett	3. Beehive	No result
1:15.81	7. Completed	Jay Lewis	Alex Goodwin	4. Hopscotch	No result
1:17.89	7. Completed	Evan Andrews	David Campbell	7. Completed	2:06.11
1:32.73	7. Completed	Luke Dillon	Ramcis Valdez	5. Slingshot	0:33.00
1:34.95	7. Completed	Kevin Rodriguez	Austin Baron	2. Spring Forward	No result
2:01.31	7. Completed	Jonathan Godbout	Verdale Benson	4. Hopscotch	No result
2:04.59	7. Completed	James McGrath	Evan Bomengen	5. Slingshot	1:11.77
2:11.85	7. Completed	Matt D'Amico	Ibrahim Hayek	3. Beehive	No result
2:20.83	7. Completed	Rachel Degutz	Abby Clark	4. Hopscotch	No result
0:38.18	5. Slingshot	Joe Moravsky	Noah Jones	3. Beehive	No result
0:49.34	5. Slingshot	Najee Richardson	Mazeiah Andrade	4. Hopscotch	No result
1:00.97	5. Slingshot	Taylor Johnson	Casey Rothschild	4. Hopscotch	No result
1:08.05	5. Slingshot	Addy Herman	Brittney Durant	4. Hopscotch	No result
1:14.27	Withdrew; 4. Hopscotch	Sean Bryan	John Uga	3. Beehive	No result
0:51.02	4. Hopscotch	Emily Gardiner	Michelle Warnky-Buurma	4. Hopscotch	No result

=== Semifinal 3 ===
On the third and final night of the semifinals, two rounds took place. In round 3, former American Ninja Warrior Junior competitors Vance Walker and Isaiah Thomas faced each other at the end of the night in a race for the Safety Pass, with Walker narrowly coming out on top. 15-year old Madelyn Madaras became the third woman this season to clear the semifinals course, as she won her race and advanced to the National Finals. Sandy Zimmerman won her race and earned her first trip to the National Finals after 8 years of competing after her opponent, Isabella Wakeham, shockingly fell on the second obstacle. Isabella's brother, Isaiah Wakeham, completed the course and advanced to the National Finals as the best non-race winner. Other notable veterans not advancing to the National Finals include Abel Gonzalez, Grant McCartney, Nick Hanson, and Ian Dory (who had made his first appearance since season 11).

Race results
Winners			Losers		
Time	Result	Competitor	Competitor	Result	Time
0:52.99	Completed	Vance Walker	Erick Zamorano	Slingshot	0:58.09
1:08.33	Completed	Isaiah Thomas	Forest Strick	Slingshot	No result
1:38.63	Completed	Kyle Soderman	Sylas Snider	Slingshot	No result
2:00.59	Completed	Grant Kiningham	Isaiah Wakeham	Completed	2:05.24
2:14.56	Completed	Karsten Williams	Abel Gonzalez	Slingshot	No result
2:21.63	Completed	Jonathan Bange	Ian Dory	Sideways	No result
3:02.97	Completed	Madelyn Madaras	Anna McArthur	Slingshot	No result
0:36.43	Slingshot	Sebastian Chrismer	Grant McCartney	Sideways	No result
0:54.40	Slingshot	Jody Avila	Deion Butler	Beehive	No result
1:00.43	Slingshot	Joseph Rouse	Nick Hanson	Slingshot	No result
1:16.37	Slingshot	Barclay Stockett	Rachel Brown	Sideways	No result
1:34.41	Slingshot	Clarisa Morris	Cailin Jewell	Sideways	No result
1:41.75	Slingshot	Sandy Zimmerman	Isabella Wakeham	Flying Shelf Grab	No result
0:20.63	Sideways	Daniel Gil	Gary Weiland	Beehive	No result
0:22.79	Sideways	Cal Plohoros	Simba Jones	Flying Shelf Grab	No result
0:28.24	Sideways	Benjamin Drake	Elijah Levee	Flying Shelf Grab	No result

=== Semifinal 4 ===
The fourth round of semifinals happened on the same night. R.J. Roman took the fastest time and also won a Safety Pass after defeating Elijah Browning in the final race, finishing in under 40 seconds. Caleb Bergstrom and his wife, Ashley, made history as the first married couple to advance to the National Finals together; also advancing was Caleb's brother-in-law, David Bergstrom-Wright. David's wife (and Caleb's sister), Caitlyn Bergstrom-Wright, did not advance after being eliminated in her race by her sister-in-law, Ashley (had Caitlyn won the race, she and David would have been the first married couple to advance together instead of Caleb and Ashley). Veterans Brett Sims and Bob Reese advanced to the National Finals as the two top race losers after both of them completed the course. Two notable veterans who did not advance to the National Finals were Ryan Stratis (who appeared for the first time since season 11) and Jessie Graff.

Race results
Winners			Losers		
Time	Result	Competitor	Competitor	Result	Time
0:48.76	Completed	R.J. Roman	Daniel Osmer	Beehive	No result
0:53.89	Completed	Elijah Browning	Roberto Garemore	Slingshot	0:36.06
0:56.14	Completed	Nacssa Garemore	Isaiah Lee	Slingshot	1:12.43
0:57.56	Completed	Caleb Bergstrom	Jason Grossman	Slingshot	No result
1:08.26	Completed	Ethan Bartnicki	D.C. Banks	Sideways	No result
1:28.08	Completed	Enzo DeFerrari Wilson	Kyle Schulze	Sideways	No result
1:33.01	Completed	Brandon Thomas	Brett Sims	Completed	1:42.62
1:37.81	Completed	Vinnie Castranova	Bob Reese	Completed	2:29.24
2:04.51	Completed	Flip Rodriguez	Johnny Brown	Slingshot	No result
No result	Slingshot	David Bergstrom-Wright	Josh Heman-Ackah	Sideways	No result
1:01.40	Slingshot	Jaleesa Himka	Jessie Graff	Sideways	No result
1:21.93	Slingshot	Ashley Bergstrom	Caitlyn Bergstrom-Wright	Slingshot	No result
1:31.58	Slingshot	Zhanique Lovett	Dara DePaolo	Home Run	No result
1:56.41	Slingshot	Emma Pereyra	Jeri D'Aurelio	Beehive	No result
No result	Sideways	Austin Hair	Ryan Stratis	Sideways	No result
No result	Flying Shelf Grab	Alex Romer	Matt Kalanz	Flying Shelf Grab	No result

== National Finals ==
Taking place on the Las Vegas Strip as usual, the National Finals have undergone changes for stages 1 and 2.

=== Stage 1 ===
In stage 1 (which was spread out over 2 nights), the contestants had 2 minutes and 50 seconds to clear the 8-obstacle course in order to advance to stage 2. However, this season it was important for 24 contestants to advance due to changes applied to stage 2; this way, not only finishers but athletes who made it the furthest in the least amount of time would advance to the next stage. Two new obstacles were introduced in the stage this season: The Gambler and Thread the Needle. In the first night, Bob Reese successfully performed a front flip on the Jumping Spider after failing to do it in the previous season and veteran Flip Rodriguez timed out at the cargo net which does not officially count as an obstacle. During the second night, veteran Najee Richardson failed to advance in what could be his final run due to an asthma attack and R.J. Roman advanced only after using his Safety Pass when his first run saw him fall on Thread the Needle. No woman completed the stage or received a seed in Stage 2, with rookie Taylor Greene making it farther than any other, getting as far as Dipping Birds.

Denotes competitor who used the Safety Pass after failing on his first run.

Top 24 Competitors
Rank	Competitor	Time	Furthest Obstacle
1	Kaden Lebsack	2:01.07	Completed
2	Evan Andrews	2:01.41	Completed
3	Caleb Bergstrom	2:02.32	Completed
4	R.J. Roman	2:08.56	Completed
5	Hans Hertz	2:10.51	Completed
6	Noah Meunier	2:11:00	Completed
7	Enzo DeFerrari Wilson	2:27.50	Completed
8	Jackson Twait	2:27.80	Completed
9	Josiah Pippel	2:30.15	Completed
10	Vance Walker	2:31.66	Completed
11	Isaiah Thomas	2:31.75	Completed
12	Joe Moravsky	2:32.76	Completed
13	Jera Boyd	2:32.95	Completed
14	Daniel Gil	2:33.01	Completed
15	Ethan Bartnicki	2:37.88	Completed
16	Austin Gray	2:38.84	Completed
17	Nacssa Garemore	2:44.96	Completed
18	Luke Dillon	2:46.16	Completed
19	Alex Romer	2:50.00	Cargo Net
20	Flip Rodriguez	2:50.00	Cargo Net
21	Ben Behrends	2:50.00	Cargo Net
22	Kyle Soderman	1:49.75	Cargo Net (Note: Soderman reached Cargo Net faster than the others but could not refrain, therefore it was not considered he has reached it.)
23	Jonathan Bange	1:50.51	Thread the Needle
24	Elijah Browning	1:58.38	Thread the Needle

=== Stage 2 ===
For the first time ever, the stage is not timed because of the new racing format previously introduced in semifinals. It also disallows competitors who fail to use their Safety Pass to retry the stage for the first time since its introduction. Instead, the top four losers compete with each other in two races, with the winner from each race advancing to Stage Three. One new obstacle debuted, Jawbreakers. During the races, veterans Joe Moravsky, Josiah Pippel, and Flip Rodriguez were eliminated, as well as reigning Last Ninja Standing Kaden Lebsack, who fell into the water for the first time in his three-year career.

Denotes the fastest non-winners who advanced to the runoffs.

Race results
Winners		Losers	
Result	Competitor	Competitor	Result
Completed	Austin Gray	Josiah Pippel	Epic Air Surfer
Completed	Caleb Bergstrom	Kyle Soderman	Falling Shelves
Completed	Elijah Browning	Kaden Lebsack	Epic Air Surfer
Completed	Jera Boyd	Joe Moravsky	Jawbreakers
Completed	Hans Hertz	Flip Rodriguez	Jawbreakers
Completed	Naccsa Garemore	Jackson Twait	Epic Air Surfer
Completed	Noah Meunier	Alex Romer	Epic Air Surfer
Completed	R.J. Roman	Ben Behrends	Epic Air Surfer
Falling Shelves	Daniel Gil	Isaiah Thomas	Jawbreakers
Falling Shelves	Ethan Bartnicki	Vance Walker	Falling Shelves
Falling Shelves	Jonathan Bange	Evan Andrews	Jawbreakers
Epic Air Surfer	Enzo DeFerrari Wilson	Luke Dillon	Epic Air Surfer
Non-winner Runoffs
Completed	Kyle Soderman	Josiah Pippel	Epic Air Surfer
Completed	Vance Walker	Alex Romer	Swing Surfer

=== Stage 3 ===
Stage 3 retained its format from the previous seasons, so only the competitors who pass it advance to the final stage. 2 new obstacles were introduced this season: Pressure Cooker and Road Signs. Slam Dunk made its Stage 3 debut.

Advancing
Competitor
Nacssa Garemore
Daniel Gil
Elliot Revak
Ethan Bartnicki
Caleb Bergstrom
Vance Walker
Hans Hertz
Jaxon Longstaff
Noah Meunier
R.J. Roman

Not advancing
Competitor	Furthest obstacle
Enzo DeFerrari Wilson	Road Signs
Austin Gray	Road Signs
Elijah Browning	Road Signs
Jera Boyd	Road Signs
Jonathan Bange	Ultimate Cliffhanger
Kyle Soderman	Ultimate Cliffhanger

=== Stage 4 ===
Daniel Gil became the fourth American Ninja Warrior and the second runner-up to achieve Total Victory, while Vance Walker became the fifth American Ninja Warrior and the third to win $1,000,000.

Results
Rank	Competitor	Time
1	Vance Walker	00:26.75
2	Daniel Gil	00:27.99
Failed
3	Noah Meunier	00:33.50
4	Caleb Bergstrom	00:37.51
5	Nacssa Garemore	00:40.18
6	Hans Hertz	00:42.32
7	Ethan Bartnicki	00:46.40
8	R.J. Roman	—N/a

== Production ==
The series was officially announced by NBC in late March, though the applications were being accepted from November 19, 2022, until December 16, 2022. The full list of competitors was published on March 15, 2023. Filming for qualifiers moved to Los Angeles, California, where the semifinals remained. Filming for national finals remained in Las Vegas, Nevada.

Filming for the season began on March 15, 2023 and wrapped in early May 2023.

== Release ==
=== Broadcasting ===
On March 30, 2023, NBC revealed the premiere date and timeslot for the season. The timeslot of previous seasons, Monday 8:00, was kept (however most episodes are reduced to one hour, with notable exceptions), with reruns scheduled regularly on Sunday 7:00 (except for conflicts with the three consecutive Sundays of conflicts with the USGA U. S. Open and NASCAR Nashville and Chicago rounds, all of which were in prime time) and on select weeks on Thursday at 9:00 and Friday at 8:00. The season airs on NBC.

=== Ratings ===
Episode		Air Date			
Episode		Air Date	Timeslot (ET)	Rating (18–49)	Viewers (Millions)
1	Qualifiers #1 & #2	June 5, 2023	Monday 8:00 PM	0.5	3.09
2	Qualifiers #3	June 12, 2023	Monday 8:00 PM	0.4	3.08
3	Qualifiers #4	June 19, 2023	Monday 8:00 PM	0.5	3.09
4	Qualifiers #5	June 26, 2023	Monday 8:00 PM	0.4	3.02
5	Qualifiers #6	July 10, 2023	Monday 8:00 PM	0.3	2.84
6	Qualifiers #7	July 17, 2023	Monday 8:00 PM	0.4	3.14
7	Qualifiers #8	July 24, 2023	Monday 8:00 PM	0.3	3.15
8	Semifinals #1	July 31, 2023	Monday 8:00 PM	0.4	3.17
9	Semifinals #2	August 7, 2023	Monday 8:00 PM	0.4	3.23
10	Semifinals #3 & #4	August 14, 2023	Monday 8:00 PM	0.4	3.04
11	National Finals #1	August 21, 2023	Monday 8:00 PM	0.4	3.04
12	National Finals #2	August 28, 2023	Monday 8:00 PM	0.4	3.30
13	National Finals #3	September 4, 2023	Monday 8:00 PM	0.4	2.98
14	National Finals #4	September 11, 2023	Monday 8:00 PM	0.3	2.93
