= Gbàjàbíàmílà =

Nigerian coined name

Gbajabiamila
- Gender: Male
- Language: Yoruba

Origin
- Origin: Nigeria
- Meaning: Ori gbalaja bi Amila. A gigantic handsome man just like the Amila (Amila is an historic lagos king's staff)
- Region of origin: Olowogbowo Lagos, South West, Nigeria

Gbajabiamila is a Nigerian male coined name and surname of Yoruba origin. Coined from (ORI GBALAJA BI AMILA) meaning "A gigantic handsome man just like the Amila (Amila is an historic Lagos king's staff).

Notable individuals with the name include:

- Akbar Gbajabiamila (born 1979), professional American football player
- Femi Gbajabiamila (born 1962), Nigerian lawyer and politician
