= American Ninja Warrior season 14 =

Season of American reality/sport competition television series American Ninja Warrior

American Ninja Warrior
- Season 14
- Hosted by: Matt Iseman; Akbar Gbaja-Biamila; Zuri Hall
- Finals venue: Mount Midoriyama (Las Vegas Strip)
- No. of episodes: 12

Release
- Original network: NBC
- Original release: June 6 – August 29, 2022

Season chronology
- ← Previous; Season 13 Next → Season 15

The fourteenth season of American Ninja Warrior premiered on June 6, 2022, on NBC. A spin-off from the Japanese reality series Sasuke, it is hosted by Matt Iseman, Akbar Gbaja-Biamila, and Zuri Hall. Filming for the season was similar to that of the thirteenth season, as it was taped in fewer cities, with a smaller audience during live taping, due to the COVID-19 pandemic.

The series was officially announced by NBC in late March, though the applications were being accepted from October 21, 2021, until December 10, 2021. The full list of competitors was published on February 6, 2022. Filming for qualifiers moved to San Antonio, Texas, while the semifinals and national finals remained in Los Angeles, California, and Las Vegas, Nevada, respectively. The Grand Prize and Last Ninja Standing prize remained at $1,000,000 and $100,000, respectively. The official age requirement is 19 years old, although contestants from 15 to 19 were invited as "special guests".

Filming for the season began on March 20, 2022, and wrapped on May 17, 2022. The season featured Split Decision for the third obstacle in qualifiers, in which competitors could choose one of two obstacles to pass. This season marks the return of Akbar's Gbajabia-Moments (for the first three episodes), a segment reprising the most unusual outings of the night, where competitors usually fail on the earlier obstacles.

For the first time on American Ninja Warrior, more than 2 athletes finished Stage 3, with 5 competitors reaching Stage 4; however, all of them timed out on the final Rope Climb, thus no one claimed the $1 million grand prize. Despite this, 16-year-old Kaden Lebsack climbed to the top of the tower faster than the others in 36.77 seconds and was declared the Last Ninja Standing for the second year in a row, earning $100,000.

== Obstacles ==
Every qualifying course starts from Shrinking Steps and ends on a wall, where a competitor may choose either a 14.5 foot Warped Wall or an 18-foot Mega Wall, which, if completed, would give the contestant an immediate reward of $10,000. The third and balancing obstacle features Split Decision.

For the semifinals, four extra obstacles were added, starting from veteran Salmon Ladder and ending on Spider Trap. Split Decision is moved to the ninth obstacle which features a choice of either a balance obstacle or an arm strength obstacle, and the Mega Wall was removed. The top two competitors finishing their runs proceed to a Power Tower, where they race against each other to get to the finish and earn a Safety Pass. The winner may use it to retry either Stage 1 or Stage 2 at the National Finals.

For the National Finals, Split Decision moved to the final obstacle of Stage 1, reprising the obstacles from season 13. However, both of the obstacles were followed by a climb on a cargo net or a ladder, depending on a chosen obstacle.

Bold and Italic indicates two possible variants on Split Decision.

The obstacle was created by fans for the Obstacle Design Challenge.

=== San Antonio Qualifying ===
Event	Obstacles						Finishers
Night 1	Shrinking Steps	Rollercoaster	Domino Effect	Carnival	Salmon Roll	Warped Wall/Mega Wall	13
Night 1	Shrinking Steps	Rollercoaster	Serpent	Carnival	Salmon Roll	Warped Wall/Mega Wall	13
Night 2	Shrinking Steps	Overpass	Domino Effect	Carnival	Piston Plunge	Warped Wall/Mega Wall	11
Night 2	Shrinking Steps	Overpass	Serpent	Carnival	Piston Plunge	Warped Wall/Mega Wall	11
Night 3	Shrinking Steps	Rollercoaster	Log Runner	Kickboards	Salmon Roll	Warped Wall/Mega Wall	15
Night 3	Shrinking Steps	Rollercoaster	Burn Rubber	Kickboards	Salmon Roll	Warped Wall/Mega Wall	15
Night 4	Shrinking Steps	Shattered Panes	Log Runner	Kickboards	Final Frontier	Warped Wall/Mega Wall	8
Night 4	Shrinking Steps	Shattered Panes	Despicaballs	Kickboards	Final Frontier	Warped Wall/Mega Wall	8
Night 5	Shrinking Steps	Shattered Panes	Broken Bridge	Ring Chaser	Final Frontier	Warped Wall/Mega Wall	17
Night 5	Shrinking Steps	Shattered Panes	Despicaballs	Ring Chaser	Final Frontier	Warped Wall/Mega Wall	17

=== Los Angeles Semifinals ===
Event	Obstacles										Finishers
Night 1	Shrinking Steps	Lunatic Ledges	Air Surfer	Spinning Bridge	Kaleidoscope	Warped Wall	Salmon Ladder	Ghost Town	Dragonback	Spider Trap	4
Night 1	Shrinking Steps	Lunatic Ledges	Air Surfer	Spinning Bridge	Kaleidoscope	Warped Wall	Salmon Ladder	Ghost Town	Spin Zone	Spider Trap	4
Night 2	Shrinking Steps	Lunatic Ledges	Clockwork	Spinning Bridge	Hopscotch	Warped Wall	Salmon Ladder	Box Office	Dragonback	Spider Trap	1
Night 2	Shrinking Steps	Lunatic Ledges	Clockwork	Spinning Bridge	Hopscotch	Warped Wall	Salmon Ladder	Box Office	Spin Zone	Spider Trap	1
Night 3	Shrinking Steps	Over Under	Clockwork	Diamond Dash	Hopscotch	Warped Wall	Salmon Ladder	Box Office	Flipped Around	Spider Trap	6
Night 3	Shrinking Steps	Over Under	Clockwork	Diamond Dash	Hopscotch	Warped Wall	Salmon Ladder	Box Office	Diving Boards	Spider Trap	6
Night 4	Shrinking Steps	Over Under	Air Surfer	Diamond Dash	Kaleidoscope	Warped Wall	Salmon Ladder	Ghost Town	Flipped Around	Spider Trap	6
Night 4	Shrinking Steps	Over Under	Air Surfer	Diamond Dash	Kaleidoscope	Warped Wall	Salmon Ladder	Ghost Town	Diving Boards	Spider Trap	6

=== Las Vegas National Finals ===
Event	Obstacle(s)								Finishers
Stage 1	Slide Surfer	Three Ring Circus	Giant Rollercoaster	Jumping Spider	Tetherball	Warped Wall	Dipping Birds	The High Road (Note: Followed by a ladder)	25
Stage 1	Slide Surfer	Three Ring Circus	Giant Rollercoaster	Jumping Spider	Tetherball	Warped Wall	Dipping Birds	Fly Hooks (Note: Followed by a cargo net, at which two competitors had timed out)	25
Stage 2	Striding Steps	Double Salmon Ladder	Piston Plunge	Hammer Drop	Hornet's Nest	Falling Shelves			11
Stage 3	Patriot Pass	Stalactites	Chop It Up	Ultimate Cliffhanger	Pipe Dream	Eyeglass Alley	Flying Bar		5
Stage 4	Rope Climb								0

== San Antonio Qualifying ==
The five nights of qualifying took place in Alamodome arena in San Antonio, Texas.

The contestant finished the Mega Wall and was awarded $10,000
The woman contestant passed within top 30 competitors
The contestant is a rookie

=== Night 1 ===
The first round of qualifying featured four new obstacles: Rollercoaster, the Serpent (‘Split Decision’ obstacle, along with Domino Effect), Carnival and Salmon Roll. This episode tied the record of four successful Mega Wall climbs. In addition, 15-year old Jordan Carr, a former American Ninja Warrior Junior competitor, set a record as the youngest woman ever to beat the Warped Wall. Her mentor, veteran Flip Rodriguez, barely advanced after falling on the fifth obstacle.

The episode also marked the return of James "The Beast" McGrath after a three-year absence and his proposal to Allyssa Beird, his girlfriend and fellow ninja; Beird was the only veteran who couldn't advance to the semifinals in this episode. Another proposal in the episode came from veteran Vinnie Castranova. USA Olympic soccer medalist Heather O'Reilly and 70-year old John Loobey also attempted the course but neither could advance.

Top 30 Competitors
Rank	Competitor	Time	Furthest Obstacle
1	R.J. Roman	01:51.47	Finished (Mega Wall)
2	Vinnie Castranova	02:27.73	Finished
3	Cal Plohoros	02:32.35	Finished
4	Josiah Singleton	02:36.17	Finished
5	Brett Sims	02:49.47	Finished
6	Christopher Harding Jones	02:50.55	Finished
7	Brett Hernandez Strong	02:56.83	Finished (Mega Wall)
8	Gary Hines	03:00.06	Finished
9	Jordan Carr	03:00.91	Finished
10	Ethan Bartnicki	03:08.03	Finished
11	Bob Reese	03:34.01	Finished (Mega Wall)
12	Casey Rothschild	03:44.25	Finished
13	James McGrath	03:46.72	Finished (Mega Wall)
14	Sean Garlock	N/A	Salmon Roll
15	Ronald Washington	N/A	Salmon Roll
16	Lorin Ball	N/A	Salmon Roll
17	Enzo DeFerrari Wilson	N/A	Salmon Roll
18	Vance Walker	N/A	Salmon Roll
19	Julius Ferguson	N/A	Salmon Roll
20	DeShawn Harris	N/A	Salmon Roll
21	Karen Potts	N/A	Salmon Roll
22	Jason Kotzin	N/A	Salmon Roll
23	Lilah Nathison	N/A	Salmon Roll
24	Flip Rodriguez	N/A	Salmon Roll
25	Eric Middleton	N/A	Salmon Roll
26	Kyle McCreight	N/A	Salmon Roll
27	Brad Giles	N/A	Salmon Roll
28	Jay Flores	N/A	Salmon Roll
29	Josh Wagg	N/A	Salmon Roll
30	Parish Cardenas	N/A	Salmon Roll

Top 5 Women
Rank	Competitor	Time	Furthest Obstacle
1	Jordan Carr	03:00.91	Finished
2	Casey Rothschild	03:44.25	Finished
3	Karen Potts	N/A	Salmon Roll
4	Lilah Nathison	N/A	Salmon Roll
5	Lindsay Eskildsen	N/A	Carnival

Akbar's Gbajabia-Moments
Rank	Competitor	Reason for inclusion	Furthest Obstacle
1	Caleb Dowden	Brought milk from his cow on the competition	Rollercoaster
2	James Bartholomew	Got cheered from Amar'e Stoudemire like a child	Carnival
3	Zach DiPaolo	Drove his bike before the run	Rollercoaster

=== Night 2 ===
The round introduced another new obstacle, Piston Plunge. This episode saw all five top female competitors all finish within the top 30, with three of them being teammates. Joe Moravsky scaled the Mega Wall for the third consecutive time, Najee Richardson returned after missing season 13 due to an ankle injury and 75-year old Dave Kozak became the oldest competitor of a season, easily making it onto Akbar's Gbajabia-Moments.

Among the famous participants were current WBA-NABA super featherweight boxer Abraham Nova, who couldn't pass the first obstacle, and Miss Massachusetts 2019-2020 Lindsey Littlefield, who failed on the second obstacle. Veterans Jessie Graff, who had returned after missing the previous season because of knee and shoulder injuries, and Sandy Zimmerman, the first mother to ever clear qualifying, also were unable to advance to the semifinals, failing on the Serpent and Carnival respectively. Also, 2020 Olympics silver medalist MyKayla Skinner joined Matt and Akbar in the booth and reported the run of her husband, who also failed on the Serpent.

Top 30 Competitors
Rank	Competitor	Time	Furthest Obstacle
1	Matt Bradley	01:44.73	Finished
2	Matt D’Amico	01:59.84	Finished
3	Luke Dillon	02:07.71	Finished
4	Joe Moravsky	02:16.51	Finished (Mega Wall)
5	Josiah Pippel	02:21.88	Finished (Mega Wall)
6	James Sannella	02:22.01	Finished
7	Jay Lewis	02:25.98	Finished
8	Jacob Arnstein	02:27.27	Finished
9	Ryan Sanders	03:07.69	Finished
10	Jeremy Warters	03:23.25	Finished
11	Najee Richardson	03:41.18	Finished
12	Xavier Dantzler	N/A	Piston Plunge
13	Lucas Reale	N/A	Piston Plunge
14	Joe Capo	N/A	Piston Plunge
15	Dave Cavanagh	N/A	Piston Plunge
16	Darion Bennett	N/A	Piston Plunge
17	James Burns	N/A	Piston Plunge
18	Sophia Lavallee	01:30.22	Piston Plunge
19	Alex Begolly	N/A	Piston Plunge
20	Abby Clark	01:34.17	Piston Plunge
21	Branden McWilliams	N/A	Piston Plunge
22	Stewart Mahler	N/A	Piston Plunge
23	Tyler Behrle	N/A	Piston Plunge
24	Cara Mack	01:54.35	Piston Plunge
25	John Uga	N/A	Piston Plunge
26	Rachel Degutz	02:05.30	Piston Plunge
27	Steve Donnelly	N/A	Piston Plunge
28	Anthony Eardley	N/A	Piston Plunge
29	Jennifer Stefano	02:26.58	Piston Plunge
30	Guang Cui	N/A	Piston Plunge
31	Ryan Hermstein	N/A	Piston Plunge

Top 5 Women
Rank	Competitor	Time	Furthest Obstacle
1	Sophia Lavallee	01:30.22	Piston Plunge
2	Abby Clark	01:34.17	Piston Plunge
3	Cara Mack	01:54.35	Piston Plunge
4	Rachel Degutz	02:05.30	Piston Plunge
5	Jennifer Stefano	02:26.58	Piston Plunge

Akbar's Gbajabia-Moments
Rank	Competitor	Reason for inclusion	Furthest Obstacle
1	Dave Kozak	Entered on the start line in USAF costume; walked down Shrinking Steps	Shrinking Steps
2	James Burns	Presented a lego sculpture of host tower and the walls to Matt and Akbar	Piston Plunge; qualified
3	Robbie Jimenes	Played his guitar longer than ran the course	Shrinking Steps

=== Night 3 ===
Another new obstacle was introduced, Kickboards, and two obstacles from the first night, Rollercoaster and Salmon Roll, returned. Domino Effect and the Serpent at Split Decision were replaced by the Log Runner and Burn Rubber, respectively.

Two former Olympians were present on a course. Former speed skater K. C. Boutiette, who now fights his daughter's 1p36 deletion syndrome, attempted and advanced to the semifinals in 30th place, and former artistic gymnast Shawn Johnson covered the run of her husband in the booth with Matt and Akbar. The Coyote, a mascot of San Antonio Spurs, cheered the competitors from the sideline. Akbar's Gbajabia-Moments featured only two contestants instead of three.

Top 30 Competitors
Rank	Competitor	Time	Furthest Obstacle
1	Chris Behrends	01:45.70	Finished
2	Kaden Lebsack	01:46.63	Finished
3	Ethan Swanson	01:59.83	Finished
4	Max Feinberg	02:19.79	Finished
5	Cam Baumgartner	02:25.85	Finished
6	Tieg Scott	02:28.57	Finished
7	Devan Alexander	02:37.67	Finished
8	Mike Silenzi	02:57.99	Finished
9	Levi Enright	03:02.31	Finished (Mega Wall)
10	Chris DiGangi	03:06.55	Finished
11	Ethan Gardulski	03:11.07	Finished
12	Jamie Rahn	03:13.69	Finished
13	Joe Brown	03:33.36	Finished
14	Jesse Labreck	04:19.39	Finished
15	Roo Yori	04:36.68	Finished
16	Jackson Twait	N/A	Salmon Roll
17	Jon Klippenstein	N/A	Salmon Roll
18	Michael Bougher	N/A	Salmon Roll
19	Derrick Pavoni	N/A	Salmon Roll
20	Leif Sundberg	N/A	Salmon Roll
21	Addy Herman	N/A	Salmon Roll
22	Scott Bishop	N/A	Salmon Roll
23	Kyle Schulze	N/A	Salmon Roll
24	Brandon Varner	N/A	Salmon Roll
25	Andrew Stoinski	N/A	Salmon Roll
26	James Wilson	N/A	Salmon Roll
27	Nathan Green	N/A	Salmon Roll
28	Drew Nester	N/A	Salmon Roll
29	Steven Bachta	N/A	Salmon Roll
30	KC Boutiette	N/A	Salmon Roll

Top 5 Women
Rank	Competitor	Time	Furthest Obstacle
1	Jesse Labreck	04:19.39	Finished
2	Addy Herman	N/A	Salmon Roll
3	Maggie Owen	N/A	Kickboards
4	Maggi Thorne	N/A	Kickboards
5	Elizabeth Leslie	N/A	Kickboards

Akbar's Gbajabia-Moments
Rank	Competitor	Reason for inclusion	Furthest Obstacle
1	Mike Gilleski	His cheerleader dressed like a pencil on the course	Kickboards
2	Jordan Freeman	Brought grilled ribs in a grill to Matt and Akbar	Log Runner

=== Night 4 ===
Three more new obstacles were introduced: the Shattered Panes, the Despica-balls (created to promote the 2022 film Minions: The Rise of Gru) at Split Decision, and Final Frontier. Present on the sidelines in this episode was Rowdy, the mascot for the University of Texas at San Antonio Roadrunners, alongside the UTSA cheerleaders. This episode set a new record with seven women all finishing in the top 30.

Top 30 Competitors
Rank	Competitor	Time	Furthest Obstacle
1	Nate Hansen	02:12.99	Finished
2	Austin Gray	02:16.35	Finished
3	Owen Dyer	03:02.03	Finished
4	Jody Avila	03:15.98	Finished
5	Christian Youst	03:45.48	Finished
6	Isaiah Wakeham	03:46.99	Finished
7	Mark Antioquia	04:03.33	Finished
8	Katie Bone	05:08.92	Finished
9	Donovan Metoyer	01:19.61	Final Frontier
10	Isaiah Thomas	01:21.20	Final Frontier
11	Tristan Wyman	01:24.67	Final Frontier
12	Zack Eichenstein	01:31.66	Final Frontier
13	Ryan Meeks	01:34.45	Final Frontier
14	Antwan McClendon	01:46.43	Final Frontier
15	Parker Hewes	01:46.77	Final Frontier
16	Rohan Sebastian	01:46.84	Final Frontier
17	David Tomassoni	01:47.08	Final Frontier
18	Tyler Yamauchi	01:48.53	Final Frontier
19	Emmanuel Aouad	01:52.26	Final Frontier
20	Devin Harr	01:53.28	Final Frontier
21	Isabella Wakeham	01:59.15	Final Frontier
22	Dan Polizzi	02:01.39	Final Frontier
23	Mark Farrell	02:05.01	Final Frontier
24	Sem Garay	02:06.78	Final Frontier
25	Nicki Asirvadam	02:07.33	Final Frontier
26	Anabella Heinrichs	02:21.15	Final Frontier
27	Jaelyn Bennett	02:28.41	Final Frontier
28	Barclay Stockett	03:00.09	Final Frontier
29	Liv Hackmann	00:46.83	Kickboards
30	Megan Rowe	00:53.12	Kickboards

Top 5 Women
Rank	Competitor	Time	Furthest Obstacle
1	Katie Bone	05:08.92	Finished
2	Isabella Wakeham	01:59.15	Final Frontier
3	Anabella Heinrichs	02:21.15	Final Frontier
4	Jaelyn Bennett	02:28.41	Final Frontier
5	Barclay Stockett	03:00.09	Final Frontier

=== Night 5 ===
Making his ANW debut in this episode was reigning American Ninja Warrior Junior champion Jackson Erdos, who had just turned 15 prior to the filming of this competition. David Campbell and Brian Kretsch both competed again, maintaining their status as the only two competitors to ever run in every single season of the show; Campbell cleared the course to become this season's oldest finisher in qualifying. Another veteran competitor, Josh Levin, made his return for the first time since season 10 after spending the last three years attending Harvard University, where he earned his master's degree in learning design, innovation and technology.

Top 30 Competitors
Rank	Competitor	Time	Furthest Obstacle
1	John Mack	01:49.65	Finished (Mega Wall)
2	Hunter Guerard	01:57.38	Finished
3	Jeramiah Boyd	02:06.54	Finished (Mega Wall)
4	Caiden Madzelan	02:09.52	Finished
5	Elijah Browning	02:22.66	Finished
6	Kyle Soderman	02:27.27	Finished (Mega Wall)
7	Jackson Erdos	02:28.01	Finished
8	Sean Bryan	02:33.59	Finished
9	Ruben Arellano	02:50.58	Finished
10	David Campbell	03:05.19	Finished
11	Adam Rayl	03:24.22	Finished
12	Grant Nguyen	03:33.68	Finished
13	Alex Nye	03:34.43	Finished
14	Jonah Bonner	03:35.89	Finished
15	Anthony Porter	03:42.30	Finished
16	Josh Levin	04:30.35	Finished
17	Brittney Durant	04:43.77	Finished
18	Izabella Adkins	02:47.05	Warped Wall
19	Evan Andrews	00:48.04	Final Frontier
20	Tyler Kurtzhals	00:57.11	Final Frontier
21	David Funk	00:57.82	Final Frontier
22	Luke Mizel	01:09.85	Final Frontier
23	Lance Pekus	01:10.42	Final Frontier
24	Steven Cen	01:12.03	Final Frontier
25	Paris Juarez	01:15.38	Final Frontier
26	Mike Beadle	01:16.18	Final Frontier
27	Francisco Barajas	01:29.90	Final Frontier
28	Verdale Benson	01:32.34	Final Frontier
29	Asaf Goren	01:36.94	Final Frontier
30	Mady Howard	01:38.67	Final Frontier

Top 5 Women
Rank	Competitor	Time	Furthest Obstacle
1	Brittney Durant	04:43.77	Finished
2	Izabella Adkins	02:47.05	Warped Wall
3	Paris Juarez	01:15.38	Final Frontier
4	Mady Howard	01:38.67	Final Frontier
5	Tiana Webberley	01:47.96	Final Frontier

=== San Antonio Qualifying Leaderboard ===
Top 151 Competitors
Rank	Competitor	Time	Furthest Obstacle
1	Matt Bradley	1:44.73	Finished
2	Chris Behrends	1:45.70	Finished
3	Kaden Lebsack	1:46.63	Finished
4	John Mack	1:49.65	Finished (Mega Wall)
5	R.J. Roman	1:51.47	Finished (Mega Wall)
6	Hunter Guerard	1:57.38	Finished
7	Ethan Swanson	1:59.83	Finished
8	Matt D’Amico	1:59.84	Finished
9	Jeramiah Boyd	2:06.54	Finished (Mega Wall)
10	Luke Dillon	2:07.71	Finished
11	Caiden Madzelan	2:09.52	Finished
12	Nate Hansen	2:12.99	Finished
13	Austin Gray	2:16.35	Finished
14	Joe Moravsky	2:16.51	Finished (Mega Wall)
15	Max Feinberg	2:19.79	Finished
16	Josiah Pippel	2:21.88	Finished (Mega Wall)
17	James Sannella	2:22.01	Finished
18	Elijah Browning	2:22.66	Finished
19	Cam Baumgartner	2:25.85	Finished
20	Jay Lewis	2:25.98	Finished
21	Jacob Arnstein	2:27.27	Finished
22	Kyle Soderman	2:27.27	Finished (Mega Wall)
23	Vinnie Castranova	2:27.73	Finished
24	Jackson Erdos	2:28.01	Finished
25	Tieg Scott	2:28.57	Finished
26	Cal Plohoros	2:32.35	Finished
27	Sean Bryan	2:33.59	Finished
28	Josiah Singleton	2:36.17	Finished
29	Devan Alexander	2:37.67	Finished
30	Brett Sims	2:49.47	Finished
31	Christopher Harding Jones	2:50.55	Finished
32	Ruben Arellano	2:50.58	Finished
33	Brett Hernandez Strong	2:56.83	Finished (Mega Wall)
34	Mike Silenzi	2:57.99	Finished
35	Gary Hines	3:00.06	Finished
36	Jordan Carr	3:00.91	Finished
37	Owen Dyer	3:02.03	Finished
38	Levi Enright	3:02.31	Finished (Mega Wall)
39	David Campbell	3:05.19	Finished
40	Chris DiGangi	3:06.55	Finished
41	Ryan Sanders	3:07.69	Finished
42	Ethan Bartnicki	3:08.03	Finished
43	Ethan Gardulski	3:11.07	Finished
44	Jamie Rahn	3:13.69	Finished
45	Jody Avila	3:15.98	Finished
46	Jeremy Warters	3:23.25	Finished
47	Adam Rayl	3:24.22	Finished
48	Joe Brown	3:33.36	Finished
49	Grant Nguyen	3:33.68	Finished
50	Bob Reese	3:34.01	Finished (Mega Wall)
51	Alex Nye	3:34.43	Finished
52	Jonah Bonner	3:35.89	Finished
53	Najee Richardson	3:41.18	Finished
54	Anthony Porter	3:42.30	Finished
55	Casey Rothschild	3:44.25	Finished
56	Christian Youst	3:45.48	Finished
57	James McGrath	3:46.72	Finished (Mega Wall)
58	Isaiah Wakeham	3:46.99	Finished
59	Mark Antioquia	4:03.33	Finished
60	Jesse Labreck	4:19.39	Finished
61	Josh Levin	4:30.35	Finished
62	Roo Yori	4:36.68	Finished
63	Brittney Durant	4:43.77	Finished
64	Katie Bone	5:08.92	Finished
65	Izabella Adkins	2:47.05	Warped Wall
66	Kevin Carbone	N/A	Salmon Roll
67	Ronald Washington	N/A	Salmon Roll
68	Lorin Ball	N/A	Salmon Roll
69	Enzo DeFerrari Wilson	N/A	Salmon Roll
70	Vance Walker	N/A	Salmon Roll
71	Julius Ferguson	N/A	Salmon Roll
72	DeShawn Harris	N/A	Salmon Roll
73	Karen Potts	N/A	Salmon Roll
74	Jason Kotzin	N/A	Salmon Roll
75	Lilah Nathison	N/A	Salmon Roll
76	Flip Rodriguez	N/A	Salmon Roll
77	Eric Middleton	N/A	Salmon Roll
78	Kyle McCreight	N/A	Salmon Roll
79	Brad Giles	N/A	Salmon Roll
80	Jay Flores	N/A	Salmon Roll
81	Josh Wagg	N/A	Salmon Roll
82	Parish Cardenas	N/A	Salmon Roll
83	Xavier Dantzler	N/A	Piston Plunge
84	Lucas Reale	N/A	Piston Plunge
85	Joe Capo	N/A	Piston Plunge
86	Dave Cavanagh	N/A	Piston Plunge
87	Darion Bennett	N/A	Piston Plunge
88	James Burns	N/A	Piston Plunge
89	Alex Begolly	N/A	Piston Plunge
90	Branden McWilliams	N/A	Piston Plunge
91	Stewart Mahler	N/A	Piston Plunge
92	Tyler Behrle	N/A	Piston Plunge
93	John Uga	N/A	Piston Plunge
94	Steve Donnelly	N/A	Piston Plunge
95	Anthony Eardley	N/A	Piston Plunge
96	Guang Cui	N/A	Piston Plunge
97	Ryan Hermstein	N/A	Piston Plunge
98	Jackson Twait	N/A	Salmon Roll
99	Jon Klippenstein	N/A	Salmon Roll
100	Michael Bougher	N/A	Salmon Roll
101	Derrick Pavoni	N/A	Salmon Roll
102	Leif Sundberg	N/A	Salmon Roll
103	Addy Herman	N/A	Salmon Roll
104	Scott Bishop	N/A	Salmon Roll
105	Kyle Schulze	N/A	Salmon Roll
106	Brandon Varner	N/A	Salmon Roll
107	Andrew Stoinski	N/A	Salmon Roll
108	James Wilson	N/A	Salmon Roll
109	Nathan Green	N/A	Salmon Roll
110	Drew Nester	N/A	Salmon Roll
111	Steven Bachta	N/A	Salmon Roll
112	KC Boutiette	N/A	Salmon Roll
113	Evan Andrews	0:48.04	Final Frontier
114	Tyler Kurtzhals	0:57.11	Final Frontier
115	David Funk	0:57.82	Final Frontier
116	Luke Mizel	1:09.85	Final Frontier
117	Lance Pekus	1:10.42	Final Frontier
118	Steven Cen	1:12.03	Final Frontier
119	Paris Juarez	1:15.38	Final Frontier
120	Mike Beadle	1:16.18	Final Frontier
121	Donovan Metoyer	1:19.61	Final Frontier
122	Isaiah Thomas	1:21.20	Final Frontier
123	Tristan Wyman	1:24.67	Final Frontier
124	Francisco Barajas	1:29.90	Final Frontier
125	Sophia Lavallee	1:30.22	Piston Plunge
126	Verdale Benson	1:32.34	Final Frontier
127	Asaf Goren	1:36.94	Final Frontier
128	Mady Howard	1:38.67	Final Frontier
129	Zack Eichenstein	1:31.66	Final Frontier
130	Abby Clark	1:34.17	Piston Plunge
131	Ryan Meeks	1:34.45	Final Frontier
132	Antwan McClendon	1:46.43	Final Frontier
133	Parker Hewes	1:46.77	Final Frontier
134	Rohan Sebastian	1:46.84	Final Frontier
135	David Tomassoni	1:47.08	Final Frontier
136	Tyler Yamauchi	1:48.53	Final Frontier
137	Emmanuel Aouad	1:52.26	Final Frontier
138	Devin Harr	1:53.28	Final Frontier
139	Cara Mack	1:54.35	Piston Plunge
140	Isabella Wakeham	1:59.15	Final Frontier
141	Dan Polizzi	2:01.39	Final Frontier
142	Mark Farrell	2:05.01	Final Frontier
143	Rachel Degutz	2:05.30	Piston Plunge
144	Sem Garay	2:06.78	Final Frontier
145	Nicki Asirvadam	2:07.33	Final Frontier
146	Anabella Heinrichs	2:21.15	Final Frontier
147	Jennifer Stefano	2:26.58	Piston Plunge
148	Jaelyn Bennett	2:28.41	Final Frontier
149	Barclay Stockett	3:00.09	Final Frontier
150	Liv Hackmann	0:46.83	Kickboards
151	Megan Rowe	0:53.12	Kickboards

Top 25 Women
Rank	Competitor	Time	Furthest Obstacle
1	Jordan Carr	3:00.91	Finished
2	Casey Rothschild	3:44.25	Finished
3	Jesse Labreck	4:19.39	Finished
4	Brittney Durant	4:43.77	Finished
5	Katie Bone	5:08.92	Finished
6	Izabella Adkins	2:47.05	Warped Wall
7	Karen Potts	N/A	Salmon Roll
8	Lilah Nathison	N/A	Salmon Roll
9	Addy Herman	N/A	Salmon Roll
10	Paris Juarez	1:15.38	Final Frontier
11	Sophia Lavallee	1:30.22	Piston Plunge
12	Abby Clark	1:34.17	Piston Plunge
13	Mady Howard	1:38.67	Final Frontier
14	Tiana Webberley	1:47.96	Final Frontier
15	Cara Mack	1:54.35	Piston Plunge
16	Isabella Wakeham	1:59.15	Final Frontier
17	Rachel Degutz	2:05.30	Piston Plunge
18	Anabella Heinrichs	2:21.15	Final Frontier
19	Jennifer Stefano	2:26.58	Piston Plunge
20	Jaelyn Bennett	2:28.41	Final Frontier
21	Barclay Stockett	3:00.09	Final Frontier
22	Lindsay Eskildsen	N/A	Carnival
23	Maggie Owen	N/A	Kickboards
24	Maggi Thorne	N/A	Kickboards
25	Elizabeth Leslie	N/A	Kickboards

== Los Angeles Semifinals ==
The semifinals took place on the lot of Universal Studios Hollywood in Los Angeles, California. Standing next to the actual course is a reformed Power Tower mini-course.

The contestant was granted a Safety Pass for winning Power Tower
The woman contestant finished within top 15 competitors
The contestant is a rookie

=== Night 1 ===
Three new obstacles were introduced: Kaleidoscope, Ghost Town, and Spin Zone (at Split Decision which was now on the back half of the course).

Veterans Joe Moravsky, Flip Rodriguez and Najee Richardson attempted the course and proceeded to the National Finals, as well as Joe's student, Jay Lewis, who also received a Safety Pass for winning the Power Tower race. However, despite advancing to the National Finals, both Moravsky and Richardson could not compete in the National Finals, as Moravsky's wife, Stephanie, tested positive for COVID-19, as did Richardson himself. Other notable ninjas not to advance to the finals were Brett Sims, 15-year-old Jordan Carr (the youngest woman to complete a qualifying course) and rookie Ryan Hermstein (who participated in the semifinals despite finishing 31st overall). James Sannella, who also failed to advance in this episode, would later replace Moravsky in the National Finals.

Top 15 Competitors
Rank	Competitor	Time	Furthest Obstacle
1	Jay Lewis	03:57.49	Finished
2	Josiah Pippel	04:10.02	Finished
3	Flip Rodriguez	05:06.95	Finished
4	Luke Dillon	05:55.86	Finished
5	Matt D'Amico	02:46.79	Dragonback
6	Joe Moravsky	03:01.53	Dragonback
7	Lucas Reale	03:07.80	Spin Zone
8	Dave Cavanagh	03:53.15	Dragonback
9	Anthony Eardley	04:54.72	Dragonback
10	Najee Richardson	02:37.25	Ghost Town
11	Ryan Sanders	03:09.76	Ghost Town
12	Bob Reese	03:16.57	Ghost Town
13	Jeremy Warters	03:26.87	Ghost Town
14	Cal Plohoros	03:35.05	Ghost Town
15	Abby Clark	02:22.37	Warped Wall

Top 3 Women
Rank	Competitor	Time	Furthest Obstacle
1	Abby Clark	02:22.37	Warped Wall
2	Addy Herman	01:13.66	Kaleidoscope
3	Rachel Degutz	01:23.95	Kaleidoscope

=== Night 2 ===
Two more new obstacles were added: Hopscotch and Box Office. Only one competitor, 17-year-old Evan Andrews, finished the course in this episode, though he lost out on the Power Tower race to second-place finisher "Country Boy Ninja" Josiah Singleton (who fell at Dragonback), who earned a Safety Pass to go with his first-ever trip to the National Finals. Notable competitors who did not advance to the National Finals included “Sweet-T” Tiana Webberley, the "Cowboy Ninja" Lance Pekus, concrete worker Adam Rayl (who failed to advance to the National Finals for the first time ever), and "The Boss" Elijah Browning; American Ninja Warrior Junior champion Jackson Erdos, who also failed early in this episode, would later compete in the National Finals as the replacement for Najee Richardson (who had tested positive for COVID-19).

Top 15 Competitors
Rank	Competitor	Time	Furthest Obstacle
1	Evan Andrews	04:29.19	Finished
2	Josiah Singleton	03:36.35	Dragonback
3	Josh Levin	04:20.66	Dragonback
4	Jeramiah Boyd	02:16.41	Box Office
5	Caiden Madzelan	02:19.03	Box Office
6	Sean Bryan	02:25.49	Box Office
7	Hunter Guerard	02:39.13	Box Office
8	Kyle Soderman	02:39.60	Box Office
9	Francisco Barajas	02:46.05	Box Office
10	Grant Nguyen	02:58.38	Box Office
11	Jonah Bonner	03:34.45	Box Office
12	Anthony Porter	03:51.34	Box Office
13	David Campbell	04:50.69	Box Office
14	Izabella Adkins	01:45.53	Warped Wall
15	Ronald Washington	00:41.65	Hopscotch

Top 3 Women
Rank	Competitor	Time	Furthest Obstacle
1	Izabella Adkins	01:45.53	Warped Wall
2	Casey Rothschild	01:01.13	Spinning Bridge
3	Mady Howard	01:01.94	Spinning Bridge

=== Night 3 ===
Two more new obstacles were added: Over Under and Flipped Around, the latter obstacle as part of Split Decision. The Power Tower race came down to two Iowa ninjas, Levi Enright and "Cat Daddy" Jackson Twait, with Enright coming out on top in a narrow finish to earn a Safety Pass. In a shocking moment, Jesse "Flex" Labreck failed on the third obstacle, Clockwork, and ultimately failed to advance to the National Finals for the first time in her career. Her fiancé, Chris DiGangi, also fell early (his failure occurring on Hopscotch) and failed to advance to the National Finals for the second year in a row.

Top 15 Competitors
Rank	Competitor	Time	Furthest Obstacle
1	Levi Enright	03:51.65	Finished
2	Jackson Twait	04:25.47	Finished
3	R.J. Roman	04:40.09	Finished
4	Kaden Lebsack	04:47.49	Finished
5	Cam Baumgartner	05:10.61	Finished
6	Mike Silenzi	05:29.47	Finished
7	Jason Kotzin	03:06.35	Flipped Around
8	Ethan Swanson	03:14.46	Diving Boards
9	Jamie Rahn	03:35.30	Flipped Around
10	Drew Nester	03:36.84	Diving Boards
11	Derrick Pavoni	04:42.05	Flipped Around
12	Chris Behrends	01:42.77	Box Office
13	Sean Garlock	02:18.76	Box Office
14	Enzo DeFerrari Wilson	02:36.12	Box Office
15	Max Feinberg	02:40.26	Box Office

Top 3 Women
Rank	Competitor	Time	Furthest Obstacle
1	Karen Potts	03:29.97	Box Office
2	Megan Rowe	03:03.33	Hopscotch
3	Maggie Owen	00:23.38	Clockwork

=== Night 4 ===
The last round of the semifinals saw Colorado roommates Austin Gray and "Gnarly Ninja" Nate Hansen face off on the Power Tower, with Hansen winning the Safety Pass after Gray unexpectedly fell from the course before he could reach the end. Siblings Isaiah and Isabella Wakeham both failed on the fifth obstacle, Kaleidoscope; Isabella advanced to the National Finals for finishing among the top three women, but Isaiah did not advance as he was not among the top 15 qualifiers. In another surprising moment, James "The Beast" McGrath also fell on Kaleidoscope, and his comeback season ended without a qualification to the National Finals.

Top 15 Competitors
Rank	Competitor	Time	Furthest Obstacle
1	Austin Gray	04:15.75	Finished
2	Nate Hansen	05:10.84	Finished
3	Isaiah Thomas	05:13.84	Finished
4	Owen Dyer	05:26.85	Finished
5	Lorin Ball	05:31.54	Finished
6	Christopher Harding Jones	05:37.36	Finished
7	Vance Walker	02:37.10	Flipped Around
8	Kevin Carbone	02:40.78	Diving Boards
9	Ethan Bartnicki	03:19.22	Flipped Around
10	Donovan Metoyer	03:38.45	Diving Boards
11	Tyler Yamauchi	03:48.54	Flipped Around
12	Jacob Arnstein	03:57.81	Flipped Around
13	Katie Bone	04:30.32	Ghost Town
14	Zack Eichenstein	01:53.96	Salmon Ladder
15	Jody Avila	01:00.77	Kaleidoscope

Top 3 Women
Rank	Competitor	Time	Furthest Obstacle
1	Katie Bone	04:30.32	Ghost Town
2	Isabella Wakeham	01:29.58	Kaleidoscope
3	Barclay Stockett	01:34.27	Kaleidoscope

=== Los Angeles Semifinals Leaderboard ===
By the end of the semifinals, no female competitor was able to reach the ninth obstacle for the first time in nine years, and thus not able to beat the semifinals course for the first time in four years. Due to testing positive for COVID-19, Najee Richardson and Joe Moravsky both had to withdraw from the National Finals, with their places given to notable rookies who otherwise failed to advance by themselves.

The contestant withdrew for the finals and passed his spot to a rookie below.
The contestant (rookie) received the finals spot after the withdrawal of the above contestants.

Top 60 Competitors
Rank	Competitor	Time	Furthest Obstacle
1	Levi Enright	03:51.65	Finished
2	Jay Lewis	03:57.49	Finished
3	Josiah Pippel	04:10.02	Finished
4	Austin Gray	04:15.75	Finished
5	Jackson Twait	04:25.47	Finished
6	Evan Andrews	04:29.19	Finished
7	R.J. Roman	04:40.09	Finished
8	Kaden Lebsack	04:47.49	Finished
9	Flip Rodriguez	05:06.95	Finished
10	Cam Baumgartner	05:10.61	Finished
11	Nate Hansen	05:10.84	Finished
12	Isaiah Thomas	05:13.84	Finished
13	Owen Dyer	05:26.85	Finished
14	Mike Silenzi	05:29.47	Finished
15	Lorin Ball	05:31.54	Finished
16	Christopher Harding Jones	05:37.36	Finished
17	Luke Dillon	05:55.86	Finished
18	Vance Walker	02:37.10	Flipped Around
19	Kevin Carbone	02:40.78	Diving Boards
20	Matt D'Amico	02:46.79	Dragonback
21	Joe Moravsky	03:01.53	Dragonback
Wildcard	James Sannella	N/A	Kaleidoscope
22	Jason Kotzin	03:06.35	Flipped Around
23	Lucas Reale	03:07.80	Spin Zone
24	Ethan Swanson	03:14.46	Diving Boards
25	Ethan Bartnicki	03:19.22	Flipped Around
26	Jamie Rahn	03:35.30	Flipped Around
27	Josiah Singleton	03:36.35	Dragonback
28	Drew Nester	03:36.84	Diving Boards
29	Donovan Metoyer	03:38.45	Diving Boards
30	Tyler Yamauchi	03:48.54	Flipped Around
31	Dave Cavanagh	03:53.15	Dragonback
32	Jacob Arnstein	03:57.81	Flipped Around
33	Josh Levin	04:20.66	Dragonback
34	Derrick Pavoni	04:42.05	Flipped Around
35	Anthony Eardley	04:54.72	Dragonback
36	Chris Behrends	01:42.77	Box Office
37	Jeramiah Boyd	02:16.41	Box Office
38	Michael Bougher	02:18.76	Box Office
39	Caiden Madzelan	02:19.03	Box Office
40	Sean Bryan	02:25.49	Box Office
41	Enzo DeFerrari Wilson	02:36.12	Box Office
42	Najee Richardson	02:37.25	Ghost Town
Wildcard	Jackson Erdos	N/A	Hopscotch
43	Hunter Guerard	02:39.13	Box Office
44	Kyle Soderman	02:39.60	Box Office
45	Max Feinberg	02:40.26	Box Office
46	Francisco Barajas	02:46.05	Box Office
47	Grant Nguyen	02:58.38	Box Office
48	Ryan Sanders	03:09.76	Ghost Town
49	Bob Reese	03:16.57	Ghost Town
50	Jeremy Warters	03:26.87	Ghost Town
51	Jonah Bonner	03:34.45	Box Office
52	Cal Plohoros	03:35.05	Ghost Town
53	Anthony Porter	03:51.34	Box Office
54	Katie Bone	04:30.32	Ghost Town
55	David Campbell	04:50.69	Box Office
56	Zack Eichenstein	01:53.96	Salmon Ladder
57	Izabella Adkins	01:45.53	Warped Wall
58	Abby Clark	02:22.37	Warped Wall
59	Ronald Washington	00:41.65	Hopscotch
60	Jody Avila	01:00.77	Kaleidoscope

Top 12 Women
Rank	Competitor	Time	Furthest Obstacle
1	Karen Potts	03:29.97	Box Office
2	Katie Bone	04:30.32	Ghost Town
3	Izabella Adkins	01:45.53	Warped Wall
4	Abby Clark	02:22.37	Warped Wall
5	Addy Herman	01:13.66	Kaleidoscope
6	Rachel Degutz	01:23.95	Kaleidoscope
7	Isabella Wakeham	01:29.58	Kaleidoscope
8	Barclay Stockett	01:34.27	Kaleidoscope
9	Megan Rowe	03:03.33	Hopscotch
10	Casey Rothschild	01:01.13	Spinning Bridge
11	Mady Howard	01:01.94	Spinning Bridge
12	Maggie Owen	00:23.38	Clockwork

== Las Vegas National Finals ==
The three nights of National Finals took place in its usual spot on Las Vegas Strip. To advance, the competitors had to finish the course in a limited amount of time to proceed to the next stage. Safety Pass could be only used in the first two stages; it would be annulled if the player advanced to the third stage without using it.

The contestant used Safety Pass on this stage. Only the second attempt is recorded.
The contestant is a woman.
The contestant is a rookie.
The contestant is a female rookie.
Last Ninja Standing for Season 14.

=== Stage 1 ===
Stage 1
Rank	Competitor	Time	Furthest Obstacle
1	Ethan Swanson	01:56.08	Finished
2	Kyle Soderman	01:56.83	Finished
3	James Sannella	02:05.40	Finished
4	Evan Andrews	02:07.17	Finished
5	Jeramiah Boyd	02:09.87	Finished
6	Josiah Pippel	02:12.01	Finished
7	Josh Levin	02:15.30	Finished
8	Kaden Lebsack	02:15.92	Finished
9	R.J. Roman	02:19.09	Finished
10	Jay Lewis	02:19.85	Finished
11	Lucas Reale	02:21.93	Finished
12	Cam Baumgartner	02:25.37	Finished
13	Jackson Erdos	02:26.15	Finished
14	Max Feinberg	02:32.51	Finished
15	Josiah Singleton	02:32.84	Finished
16	Tyler Yamauchi	02:33.83	Finished
17	Flip Rodriguez	02:34.00	Finished
18	Matt D'Amico	02:34.21	Finished
19	Owen Dyer	02:36.28	Finished
20	Ethan Bartnicki	02:39.01	Finished
21	Donovan Metoyer	02:41.34	Finished
22	Grant Nguyen	02:43.75	Finished
23	Mike Silenzi	02:45.21	Finished
24	Nate Hansen	02:47.04	Finished
25	Jackson Twait	02:49.22	Finished
Failed
26	Jody Avila		Fly Hooks
27	Jonah Bonner		The High Road
28	David Campbell		Fly Hooks
29	Christopher Harding Jones		Fly Hooks
30	Anthony Porter		The High Road
31	Lorin Ball		Dipping Birds
32	Chris Behrends		Dipping Birds
33	Abby Clark		Dipping Birds
34	Zack Eichenstein		Dipping Birds
35	Levi Enright		Dipping Birds
36	Addy Herman		Dipping Birds
37	Jacob Arnstein		Tetherball
38	Francisco Barajas		Tetherball
39	Austin Gray		Tetherball
40	Hunter Guerard		Tetherball
41	Caiden Madzelan		Tetherball
42	Jamie Rahn		Tetherball
43	Enzo DeFerrari Wilson		Tetherball
44	Katie Bone		Jumping Spider
45	Dave Cavanagh		Jumping Spider
46	Anthony Eardley		Jumping Spider
47	Drew Nester		Jumping Spider
48	Derrick Pavoni		Jumping Spider
49	Cal Plohoros		Jumping Spider
50	Bob Reese		Jumping Spider
51	Casey Rothschild		Jumping Spider
52	Megan Rowe		Jumping Spider
53	Isaiah Thomas		Jumping Spider
54	Isabella Wakeham		Jumping Spider
55	Vance Walker		Jumping Spider
56	Ronald Washington		Jumping Spider
57	Michael Bougher		Giant Rollercoaster
58	Kevin Carbone		Giant Rollercoaster
59	Rachel Degutz		Giant Rollercoaster
60	Luke Dillon		Giant Rollercoaster
61	Mady Howard		Giant Rollercoaster
62	Jason Kotzin		Giant Rollercoaster
63	Maggie Owen		Giant Rollercoaster
64	Karen Potts		Giant Rollercoaster
65	Ryan Sanders		Giant Rollercoaster
66	Jeremy Warters		Giant Rollercoaster
67	Sean Bryan		Three Ring Circus
68	Izabella Adkins		Slide Surfer
69	Barclay Stockett		Slide Surfer

=== Stage 2 ===
Stage 2
Rank	Competitor	Time	Furthest Obstacle
1	Matt D'Amico	02:53.44	Finished
2	Kaden Lebsack	03:16.31	Finished
3	R.J. Roman	03:19.52	Finished
4	Josiah Pippel	03:20.47	Finished
5	Ethan Bartnicki	03:22.01	Finished
6	Jay Lewis	03:24.08	Finished
7	Max Feinberg	03:39.17	Finished
8	Nate Hansen	03:50.37	Finished
9	Cam Baumgartner	03:51.19	Finished
10	Josh Levin	03:54.84	Finished
11	Flip Rodriguez	03:56.96	Finished
Failed
12	Tyler Yamauchi		Falling Shelves
13	Evan Andrews		Hornet's Nest
14	Owen Dyer		Hornet's Nest
15	Lucas Reale		Hornet's Nest
16	Kyle Soderman		Hornet's Nest
17	Ethan Swanson		Hornet's Nest
18	Donovan Metoyer		Hammer Drop
19	Grant Nguyen		Hammer Drop
20	Jeramiah Boyd		Piston Plunge
21	Jackson Erdos		Piston Plunge
22	James Sannella		Piston Plunge
23	Mike Silenzi		Piston Plunge
24	Josiah Singleton		Piston Plunge
25	Jackson Twait		Striding Steps

=== Stage 3 ===
Stage 3
Rank	Competitor	Time	Furthest Obstacle
1	Kaden Lebsack	04:37.29	Finished
2	Jay Lewis	05:16.53	Finished
3	Josiah Pippel	05:51.21	Finished
4	R.J. Roman	06:14.88	Finished
5	Josh Levin	07:12.66	Finished
Failed
6	Matt D'Amico		Flying Bar
7	Nate Hansen		Eyeglass Alley
8	Ethan Bartnicki		Pipe Dream
9	Cam Baumgartner		Pipe Dream
10	Flip Rodriguez		Ultimate Cliffhanger
11	Max Feinberg		Chop It Up

=== Stage 4 ===
The fastest contestant to finish the final stage wins $100,000. If that contestant finishes in under 30 seconds, he or she could win the $1,000,000 grand prize if their time is the fastest. The contestant is allowed to finish the course after the 30-second timer expires in order to set a time for the first-place cash prize.

Stage 4
Rank	Competitor	Time
Failed
1	Kaden Lebsack	00:36.77
2	Jay Lewis	00:37.19
3	Josiah Pippel	00:37.97
4	R.J. Roman	00:44.60
5	Josh Levin	00:54.19

== Release ==
=== Broadcasting ===
On March 31, 2022, NBC revealed the premiere date and timeslot for the season. The timeslot of previous seasons, Monday 8:00, was kept, with reruns scheduled on Friday 8:00. The season airs on NBC.

=== Ratings ===
Episode		Air Date			
Episode		Air Date	Timeslot (ET)	Rating (18–49)	Viewers (Millions)
1	Qualifiers #1	June 6, 2022	Monday 8:00 PM	0.5	3.13
2	Qualifiers #2	June 13, 2022	Monday 8:00 PM	0.3	2.72
3	Qualifiers #3	June 20, 2022	Monday 8:00 PM	0.4	2.90
4	Qualifiers #4	June 27, 2022	Monday 8:00 PM	0.4	2.77
5	Qualifiers #5	July 11, 2022	Monday 8:00 PM	0.4	2.75
6	Semifinals #1	July 18, 2022	Monday 8:00 PM	0.4	2.73
7	Semifinals #2	July 25, 2022	Monday 8:00 PM	0.4	2.75
8	Semifinals #3	August 1, 2022	Monday 8:00 PM	0.4	2.88
9	Semifinals #4	August 8, 2022	Monday 8:00 PM	0.4	2.75
10	National Finals #1	August 15, 2022	Monday 8:00 PM	0.4	2.91
11	National Finals #2	August 22, 2022	Monday 8:00 PM	0.4	2.89
12	National Finals #3	August 29, 2022	Monday 8:00 PM	0.5	3.14
