= American Ninja Warrior Junior =

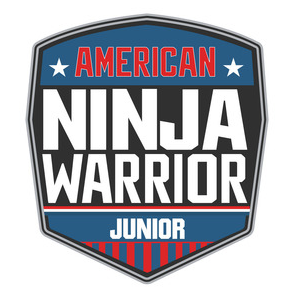
- Genre: Sports entertainment Sports competition
- Created by: Ushio Higuchi
- Presented by: Matt Iseman; Akbar Gbaja-Biamila; Laurie Hernandez; Victoria Arlen
- Country of origin: United States
- Original language: English
- No. of seasons: 3
- No. of episodes: 52

Production
- Executive producers: Arthur Smith; Kent Weed; Matt Cahoon
- Camera setup: Multi-camera
- Production companies: A. Smith & Co. Productions, Tokyo Broadcasting System

Original release
- Network: Universal Kids (seasons 1–2); Peacock (season 3)
- Release: October 13, 2018 – December 9, 2021

Related
- American Ninja Warrior; American Ninja Warrior: Ninja vs. Ninja

American Ninja Warrior Junior is an American sports competition reality show on Universal Kids that premiered in 2018. It is the children's edition of American Ninja Warrior and American Ninja Warrior: Ninja vs. Ninja, which themselves are based on the Japanese game show Sasuke. As with the rest of the franchise, the series is produced by A. Smith & Co. In May 2021, it was announced that the third season would be moving to Peacock. The show planned to return for a fourth season in February 2023, but after a series of delays, the show was cancelled.

== Format ==
American Ninja Warrior Junior is a head-to-head competition with multiple rounds and triple-elimination in each episode. There are no teams, and each child contestant competes for themselves. Contestants are divided into age groups (9&10, 11&12, 13&14). Each age group has four contestants, with a total of 12 contestants per episode. Boys and girls compete with each other without segregation. Five runs in each age group are played to determine the episode's winner in each age group, for a total of three winners per episode, one per age group. Within each age group, the first two runs are seeding races without risk of elimination. Each run's winner then faces the other run's loser, with the two winners then facing each other to determine that episode's winner in that age group.

== Obstacles ==
Obstacles are modified versions of those found in the two adult editions, to take account of the smaller size and strength of the young competitors. Obstacles in season 1 for the 9–10 age group include Sonic Swing, Tic Toc, I-Beam, Floating Tiles, Spin Cycle, and the Warped wall. Obstacles for the 11–12 age group include two new obstacles: The Ring Toss and the Fly Wheels. Obstacles for the 13–14 age group include three new obstacles: The Archer Steps, Devil Steps, and Flying Shelf Grab.

Obstacles in season 2 for the 9–10 age group include Shrinking Steps, Little Dipper, Spider Walls, Block Run, Flying Squirrel, and the Warped Wall. Obstacles for the 11–12 age group include two new obstacles: The Double Tilt-Ladders and the Wingnuts. Obstacles for the 13–14 age group include three new obstacles: Floating Steps, Crazy Cliffhanger, and the Sky Hooks.

Obstacles in season 3 for the 9–10 age group include Hopscotch, Lunatic Ledges, Liquid Pipes, Broken Bridge, Flying Saucers, and the Warped Wall. Obstacles for the 11–12 age group include two new obstacles: Spike Crossing and Spring Forward. Obstacles for the 13–14 age group include two new obstacles: Sideways and Spinball Wizard.

== Episodes ==
| Season | Episodes | Originally released | |
| Season | Episodes | First released | Last released |
|---|---|---|---|
| 1 | 20 | October 13, 2018 | April 27, 2019 |
| 2 | 17 | February 22, 2020 | June 12, 2020 |
| 3 | 15 | September 9, 2021 | December 9, 2021 |

== Seasons ==
=== Season 1 ===
Season 1 premiered on October 13, 2018, on the Universal Kids television network. Season 1 was announced in late spring of 2018 and was filmed in Los Angeles. Matt Iseman and Akbar Gbajabiamila, who host the adult editions of the franchise, served as play-by-play and color commentators respectively, with Laurie Hernandez as the on-course reporter. Contestants from the adult editions served as mentors to the Young competitors. This season these included Kevin Bull, Drew Drechsel, Natalie Duran, Meagan Martin, Najee Richardson, and Barclay Stockett.

In the 9+10 age group, Collin Cella was the winner. Sean Arms placed 2nd, Jacob Goldman placed 3rd, and Taylor Greene placed 4th. Kai Beckstrand won the 11+12 age group, with Tate Allen and Ella McRitchie in 2nd and 3rd respectively. Caleb Brown came in 4th after falling on the Ring Toss. Vance Walker was the winner of the 13+14 age group. Nate Pardo, Johnathan Godbout, and Jeremiah Boyd (who fell on the Flying Shelf Grab) came in 2nd, 3rd, and 4th.

Season 1 was licensed in Canada by Family Channel.

=== Season 2 ===
Season 2 premiered on February 22, 2020, on Universal Kids. It was filmed in the summer 2019. Paralympian Victoria Arlen replaced Hernandez as an on-course reporter while Iseman and Gbajabiamila returned as color commentators. More than 140 children competed this season.

Among the competitors for Season 2 was the son of U.S. Olympic gold medalist gymnast Dominique Moceanu, Vincent Canales.

Like season 1, it was licensed in Canada by the Family channel.

In the 9+10 age group, Nathanael Honvou was the winner. Reeder Smith, who fell on the Spider Walls, placed 2nd, Daniel Woods placed 3rd, and Owen Pham placed 4th. Jack David won the 11+12 age group, with Naccsa Garemore, Tate Allen, and Sienna Perez in 2nd, 3rd, and 4th place respectively. Vance Walker was the winner of the 13+14 age group. With his defeat of Kaden Lebsack in the championship round, Walker became the first reigning champion of American Ninja Warrior Junior. Kaden Lebsack, Devan Alexander, and Kai Beckstrand (who fell on Crazy Cliffhanger) came in 2nd, 3rd, and 4th.

The success of the format allowed the adult version in season 13 (aired in 2021) to drop the minimum age from 19 to 15. Kaden Lebsack, who was defeated by Walker in the championship round in the episodes taped in the summer of 2019, participated in his first year of eligibility and became the Last Ninja Standing, failing on the final stage at 70 feet into the 75-foot rope climb. Vance Walker participated in season 15 and scored Total Victory.

=== Season 3 ===
In May 2021, Peacock picked up the series for Season 3 with a 15-episode order. The broadcast crew remained the same this season, with Iseman, Gbajabiamila, and Arlen returned as play-by-play, color commentator, and an on-course reporter respectively. Season 3 was filmed during June 2021, and premiered on September 9, 2021.

The winners were as follows: Max Salebra (9 and 10), Bella Palmer (11 and 12), and Jackson Erdos (13 and 14). Bella Palmer was the first girl ever to win a championship in American Ninja Warrior Junior history.

== See also ==
- Gladiators 2000, a children's edition of American Gladiators.
