= Jessie Graff =

American stunt performer (born 1984)

- Born: Jessica Lauren Graff; January 12, 1984 (age 42); New York City, New York, United States
- Education: Georgia Tech; University of Nebraska–Lincoln
- Occupations: Stunt woman Martial artist Television personality
- Years active: 2007–present
- Mother: Ginny MacColl
- Awards: Action Icon Award
- Website: Official website

Jessica Lauren Graff (born January 12, 1984) is an American professional stunt woman, martial artist and athletics-based television personality. She holds a black belt in Taekwondo, a black sash in Kung Fu, and has training in five additional styles of martial arts. She is also a championship pole vaulter and a competitive gymnast.

Graff has become well known for her athletic achievements on the obstacle course show American Ninja Warrior. In 2016, she became the first woman ever to complete Stage 1 of the Las Vegas Finals course. In 2017, Graff became the first woman to compete in, and to successfully finish, Stage 2 in Las Vegas, although this was part of the USA vs. The World competition instead of a regular season, and that had no time requirement. She was the first woman representing the United States in that competition. Later on in Sasuke 34, she became the first woman worldwide to finish Stage 2 in the Sasuke/Ninja Warrior franchise, only defeated by the Ultra Crazy Cliffhanger in the third stage. She was the second woman ever to conquer the Stage 1 of the Sasuke course (excluding Kunoichi), after Chie Tanabe in Sasuke 2.

== Early life ==
Graff was born to Ginny MacColl on January 12, 1984.

At age 6, Graff started taking circus classes. By age nine, she started competitive gymnastics, training for six years as a member of the Frederick Gymnastic Club. By age 12 she was catching other performers on the trapeze. She has stated about her time as a 12-year-old trapeze artist, "The rule was I wasn’t allowed to catch anyone who outweighed me by more than 20 pounds."

Graff was a pole vaulter in high school, and graduated in 2002 from Urbana High School in Ijamsville, Maryland, as a Track Team Leader, honor roll student, and member of the National Honor Society.

She majored in aerospace engineering at Georgia Tech, and theatre at the University of Nebraska–Lincoln (UNL). She graduated from UNL in 2007.

She has earned black belts in Taekwondo and Kung Fu.

== Collegiate sports career ==
Graff is 5 ft 8 in (1.73 m) tall. In 2004, she set her personal best (PB) in the 5000m run at 15:56.30; she set her outdoor pole vault PB at 4.17 m (13 ft 8 in); and indoor pole vault PB at 4.20 m (13 ft 9 in). Graff held the pole vault record at Georgia Tech and University of Nebraska–Lincoln.

== Stuntwoman career ==
Graff started doing stunt work in 2007 and has appeared in several television shows and movies, including X-Men: First Class, Make It or Break It, Another Period, Bridesmaids, Knight and Day, Bad Teacher, John Carter, Leverage, Sons of Anarchy and The Mandalorian.

As a stuntwoman, she has done tumbling on Make It or Break It, trampolined on Another Period and has done many stunts on rooftops, the sides of bridges or buildings and dramatic wipeouts. She has said she continues to learn new skills from other stunt people who specialize in different areas.

As of 2016, her most recent high-profile stunt work was for the CBS/CW series Supergirl.

In the first scene of the 2020 feature film Wonder Woman 1984, young Diana takes part in an Amazon athletic contest that resembles Ninja Warrior; Graff portrays a competitor. She was also one of lead actress Gal Gadot’s stunt doubles.

== Obstacle competitor career ==
Graff was a contestant on the obstacle course show Wipeout's tenth episode of its first season in 2008. In that appearance, she fell in the penultimate round and thus did not make it to the Wipeout Zone.

In the summer of 2017 she competed in Sasuke 34, the original Japanese version of ANW. She was the second woman in the show's history to clear Stage 1 (the first being another stuntwoman, Chie Nishimura of Super Sentai, 19 years beforehand at Sasuke 2.) She also became the first woman ever to clear Stage 2, but failed in Stage 3.

Jessie made her second appearance in SASUKE 37, with number #98. She cleared First Stage with 31.5 seconds left and she became the only woman to complete the First Stage twice, even though the timer showed zero seconds (due to the fact that production forgotten to tune the timer to its correct value). She easily beat Second Stage with a time of 16.8 seconds left. On the Third Stage, she easily made it through the first three obstacles with little trouble, but ended up failing on the first transition of the Cliffhanger Dimension, a similar fall to her attempt at its predecessor, the Ultra Crazy Cliffhanger in SASUKE 34. This time though, she managed to grab the second ledge but was unable to hold on.

In 2020, Graff came on The Titan Games season 2, as a professional Titan. She had a possibility of not competing as she had started stem cell treatment of injured shoulders and neck.

=== American Ninja Warrior ===
On season 5 (2013) of American Ninja Warrior she became the first woman to qualify to compete in a City Finals course (although she did not complete the qualifier course). In season 6 (2014) of American Ninja Warrior she did not compete because she had a serious knee injury. In season 7 (2015), she appeared at Stage One in Las Vegas, but she did not make it up the Warped Wall.

In season 8, in the Los Angeles qualifying round, she became the first woman in American Ninja Warrior history to make it up the new 14 1/2-foot Warped Wall and moved on to the city finals along with professional rock climber Natalie Duran. This was the first time two women made it into the Top 30. In the Los Angeles city finals, Graff did not complete the course but finished second overall based on the show's "the farthest the fastest" metric. This broke her own record for the highest finish by a woman in a city competition through 2016. At the season 8 national finals at Mt. Midoriyama, Graff became the first woman to ever complete Stage 1, finishing fourth overall. She was also the first woman to ever ascend the Warped Wall on Stage 1 in Las Vegas. A stop-motion LEGO video inspired by her performance was released soon after her win.

In 2017, she became the first woman to compete in, and to successfully finish, Stage 2 in Las Vegas, although this was part of the USA vs. The World competition instead of a regular season, and had no time limit. She was the first woman representing the United States in that competition. In the 2017 regular season, American Ninja Warrior season 9, she fell on the 5th obstacle in the Daytona city qualifier. During the city finals she got past it, then got past all of the back half obstacles until the 10th and final Elevator Climb, which she did not finish. Overall, she finished 4th out of all the athletes competing in this city finals. In the National Finals, she fell on the last obstacle of stage 1.

In 2018, for American Ninja Warrior season 10, she completed the Miami City qualifier course atop the Warped Wall, with a 10th-place finish overall for the night. In the Miami city finals, she made it to the ninth obstacle, the Stair Hopper, before falling, but it was still far enough fast enough to give her a 5th-place finish overall and another trip to Las Vegas. She was ultimately unable to compete at the Las Vegas National Finals due to filming commitments in the Canary Islands for stuntwork on her project, Wonder Woman 1984.

In 2019 Graff returned to Ninja competition, appearing in American Ninja Warrior season 11, finishing 8th overall. In the city finals, she finished 3rd overall but made it farther into the 9th obstacle than any other competitor. However, in the Las Vegas finals, she fell early on Stage 1 when she failed to make the transition halfway through the Double Dipper obstacle (other ninjas had benefited from their experience the previous year with this difficult obstacle, whereas Graff had not that experience due to her Wonder Woman work).

Also in 2020, Graff competed in American Ninja Warrior season 12. She had expected to skip the season due to having stem cell treatment of an injury to her shoulders and neck, but decided to compete anyway after having participated in The Titan Games without issue during treatment. She competed in the first filming, but that was interrupted due to the COVID-19 pandemic, which further allowed her to rest and recover from her medical treatment.

In 2021, Graff had to sit out season 13 due to recovery from surgery after an injury suffered in season 12.

In 2023, Graff made it to the Semi-finals in season 15, but fell on the 4th obstacle during a head-to-head race against teenager, Jaleesa Himka, and did not make it to the Finals. Graff had previously mentored Himka during Ninja Junior. Himka went on to the finals after falling on the final move of the 5th obstacle.

== Competitions ==
- 2003 NCAA Championships indoor pole vault: 16th place – 12 feet 5.5 inches (3.797 m) [with Georgia Tech]
- 2004 Big 12 Championships outdoor pole vault: 2nd place – 13 feet 1.5 inches (4.001 m) [with UNL]
- 2004 NCAA Championships outdoor pole vault: 24th place – 12 feet 3.5 inches (3.747 m) [with UNL]
- 2004 Big 12 Championships indoor pole vault: 4th place – 13 feet 1.5 inches (4.001 m) [with UNL]
- 2004 NCAA Championships indoor pole vault: 11th place – 12 feet 11.5 inches (3.950 m) [with UNL]
- 2008 Wipeout season 1
- 2013 American Ninja Warrior season 5 – first woman to advance to a City Final
- 2015 American Ninja Warrior season 7 – first woman to sit atop the leaderboard at a city finals; first woman to advance to the National Finals
- 2016 Team Ninja Warrior season 1 – team captain of "G-Force"; only female captain
- 2016 American Ninja Warrior season 8 – One of only two competitors to make it past "The Wedge" obstacle at the City Finals, leading to finishing second at the course and top woman; She became the first woman ever to finish the Stage 1 course at the Las Vegas national finals on ANW.
- 2017 American Ninja Warrior, "USA vs. The World" – First woman to compete in, and to successfully finish, Stage 2 in Las Vegas, although this was part of the "USA vs. The World" competition instead of a regular season, and had no time requirement. She was also the first woman representing the United States in that competition.
- 2017 SASUKE 34, No. 87 – first and so far the only woman worldwide to finish Stage 2 in SASUKE/Ninja Warrior.
- 2018 American Ninja Warrior season 10 – Finished the Miami Qualifying Course, and was one of only five to make it past the “Crazy Clocks” obstacle in the city finals, finishing fifth overall in that round of competition. She was ultimately unable to compete in the national finals.
- 2019 American Ninja Warrior season 11 – Finished the Seattle-Tacoma Qualifying Course. Made it to the ninth obstacle in the city finals, and placed third overall.
- 2019 SASUKE 37, No. 98.
- 2020 The Titan Games season 2 – professional Titan, West Region.
- 2020 American Ninja Warrior season 12 – Started filming, which was then interrupted by the COVID-19 pandemic.
- 2022 American Ninja Warrior season 14
- 2022 SASUKE 40, No. 3985.
- 2024 American Ninja Warrior season 16
- 2024 SASUKE 42, only female on Team USA

== Honors ==
- Spring 2002 All-Meet pole vaulter
- 2005 Academic All-Big 12 First Team
- Fall 2003 Big 12 Commissioner's Honor Roll
- Spring 2004 Big 12 Commissioner's Honor Roll
- Fall 2004 Big 12 Commissioner's Honor Roll
- Spring 2005 Big 12 Commissioner's Honor Roll
- 2004 NCAA Division I Track Coaches Association All-Academic Team

== Personal life ==
In 2020, she received stem cell treatment for her injured shoulders and neck. This had been expected to interfere with American Ninja Warrior (season 12), and The Titan Games season 2, though that eventuality did not come to pass. She did TG2 without issue, and entered ANW12 filming. ANW12 filming was interrupted by the COVID-19 pandemic, giving her recovery time from her medical treatment.

== Sponsorship ==
Graff is sponsored by Under Armour and has her own athletic apparel collection. Her motto with the company is "Unlike Any".
