= You're Cordially Invited =

2025 film by Nicholas Stoller

- Release poster
- Directed by: Nicholas Stoller
- Written by: Nicholas Stoller
- Produced by: Nicholas Stoller; Conor Welch; Reese Witherspoon; Lauren Neustadter; Will Ferrell; Jessica Elbaum
- Starring: Will Ferrell; Reese Witherspoon; Geraldine Viswanathan; Meredith Hagner; Jimmy Tatro; Stony Blyden; Leanne Morgan; Rory Scovel; Keyla Monterroso Mejia; Ramona Young; Jack McBrayer; Fortune Feimster; Celia Weston
- Cinematography: John Guleserian
- Edited by: Daniel Gabbe; Hugh Ross
- Music by: Michael Andrews
- Production companies: Gloria Sanchez Productions; Hello Sunshine; Stoller Global Solutions
- Distributed by: Amazon MGM Studios
- Release date: January 30, 2025
- Running time: 109 minutes
- Country: United States
- Language: English

You're Cordially Invited is a 2025 American romantic comedy film written and directed by Nicholas Stoller for Amazon MGM Studios. It stars Will Ferrell and Reese Witherspoon.

When the weddings of widowed father Jim Caldwell's daughter and Margot Buckley's sister are double-booked at the same small island venue, they both try to preserve the wedding weekend.

The film was released on Amazon Prime Video on January 30, 2025, to mixed reviews from critics.

== Plot ==
Overattentive Atlanta widower Jim Caldwell is surprised to learn his daughter Jenni is engaged to marry her DJ boyfriend Oliver. Jim books their wedding at the small inn on Palmetto Island, Georgia, where he and Jenni's late mother were married, but the owner dies of a sudden heart attack before adding the booking to the calendar.

Meanwhile, Los Angeles reality TV showrunner Margot Buckley discovers her sister Neve is engaged to her exotic-dancer boyfriend Dixon. Margot also books the inn on Palmetto Island, where she and Neve visited their grandmother as children, and the inn's new manager takes their reservation, unaware of Jim's booking for the same day.

The two wedding parties arrive for the weekend, with Jim out of place among his daughter's Gen Z friends, while Margot has a strained relationship with the rest of her family. Neve reveals she is pregnant, which Margot agrees to hide from their judgmental mother, Flora. The double-booking is discovered, with Jim confirming that the owner at least scrawled the name in the book before her death (she just didn't write it down properly because her pen didn't work), but Jenni's wedding planner never explicitly confirmed as she has social anxiety and so didn't call the venue directly. Margot and Jim eventually agree to share the island, including splitting the dock at sunset for the wedding ceremonies.

A rainstorm forces Jenni's garden party indoors, joining Neve's rehearsal banquet. Jim charms Margot's family, and she is frustrated by his closeness with his daughter as he and Jenni perform "Islands in the Stream" together. Margot accidentally hits Jenni in the face during a drunken toast, and later comforts her over feeling smothered by Jim. In the morning, Jim overhears a jealous Margot criticize Jenni and his involvement in her life.

In revenge, Jim draws out Jenni and Oliver's ceremony to keep Neve and Dixon from marrying at sunset, and enlists a boat to splash them, indadvertently collapsing the dock and the Buckleys' party into the water. Sharing their fears of becoming alienated from Neve and Jenni, Margot apologizes to Jim, who then admits to interfering with Neve's ceremony.

A vengeful Margot enlists her siblings to ruin Jenni and Oliver's wedding cake, and they see someone who appears to be Oliver kissing a bridesmaid. Margot tells Jim, who is dubious, but after discovering that Oliver and Jenni are planning to move away to Memphis, he informs his daughter. Confronting Oliver, Jenni angrily begins kissing other attendees, but it is revealed that Margot actually saw one of Oliver's groomsmen. Furious with her father, Jenni leaves the island with Oliver.

Neve and Dixon announce her pregnancy, and complete their interrupted ceremony. Lashing out at her mother over her emotional unavailability, Margot exposes her siblings' secrets in the process and the family turns on her. Margot returns to her room, where Jim has changed his mind about ambushing her with an alligator, which bites her before he throws it out of the window. Dixon treats the injury, and Margot reconciles with her family and with Jim.

Discovering on social media that Jenni and Oliver have annulled their marriage, Jim hitches a ride with Margot back to Atlanta. Fighting his way through her friends, Jim has a heartfelt conversation with Jenni. She and Oliver agree they are too young to get married, but still plan to move to Memphis as a couple. After Jenni tells Margot that Jim is romantically interested in her, the two share a kiss and plan to see each other again, facilitated by his job as CEO of Delta Air Lines.

At Thanksgiving, Margot's entire family visit her in Los Angeles with Jim, Jenni, and Oliver, all taking a family photo together. Jim proposes to Margot, who suggests they elope to avoid another wedding fiasco.

== Cast ==
- Will Ferrell as Jim Caldwell, Jenni's father
- Reese Witherspoon as Margot Buckley, a TV executive and Neve's older sister
- Geraldine Viswanathan as Jenni Caldwell, a bride and Jim's daughter
- Meredith Hagner as Neve Buckley, a bride and Margot's younger sister
- Jimmy Tatro as Dixon
- Stony Blyden as Oliver
- Leanne Morgan as Gwyneth
- Rory Scovel as Colton Buckley
- Keyla Monterroso Mejia as Heather
- Ramona Young as Kelly
- Jack McBrayer as Leslie
- Fortune Feimster as Captain Barry
- Celia Weston as Flora
- Bobby Moynihan as himself
- Wyatt Russell as Masked Dancer host
- Vinny Thomas as Davey
- Peyton Manning as himself
- Lauren Holt as Abigail
- Wesley Mann as Pastor Jerry
- Nick Jonas as Pastor Luther
- Ginny MacColl as MawMaw

== Production ==
Nicholas Stoller wrote, directed, and produced the film, while Will Ferrell and Reese Witherspoon starred and serve as producers alongside Jessica Elbaum, Conor Welch, and Lauren Neustadter. Serving as executive producers are Ashley Strumwasser and Alex Brown. Production companies are Stoller Global Solutions, Gloria Sanchez Productions, and Hello Sunshine. The project landed at Amazon Studios in July 2022.

Ferrell and Witherspoon were revealed to be attached to the project in June 2022. Principal photography began in Atlanta in May 2023.

== Release ==
You're Cordially Invited was released worldwide on Amazon Prime Video on January 30, 2025.

== Reception ==
On the review aggregator website Rotten Tomatoes, 49% of 104 critics' reviews are positive, with an average rating of 5.4/10. The website's consensus reads: "While Will Ferrell and Reese Witherspoon work well together as catty combatants, tired set-pieces and a misjudged romantic subplot make this an invitation you can file under 'maybe.'" Metacritic, which uses a weighted average, assigned the film a score of 51 out of 100, based on 30 critics, indicating "mixed or average" reviews.

Matt Zoller Seitz of RogerEbert.com gave the film two and a half out of four stars and wrote, "Will Ferrell and Reese Witherspoon have both been around long enough to have become the movie star equivalent of comfort food. By this point in their respective careers, you know what you're getting, especially if the project is a comedy, and if you like it, it'll fill you up for a couple of hours. You're Cordially Invited is reheated comedy leftovers, for the most part, but there's enough warmth, sentimentality, and belly laughs to make for a raucous timewaster."
