= Ginny MacColl =

American athlete and actress (born 1951)

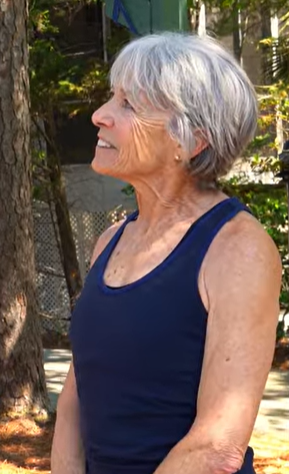
- MacColl in 2026
- Born: 1951 (age 74–75); Knoxville, Tennessee, US
- Occupations: Actor, athlete
- Known for: Oldest competitive woman Ninja Warrior athlete
- Children: 2, including Jessie Graff

Ginny MacColl (born 1951) is an American athlete and actress best known for holding the Guinness World Record for oldest competitive woman Ninja Warrior athlete. She has appeared on American Ninja Warrior four times. She is also an actress who has appeared in numerous commercials for products including Sizzlean, Mr. Clean, Wonder Bread, and Folgers, and played Evelyn in the 2019 movie Poms.

== Biography ==
MacColl was born in 1951. She was born and raised in Knoxville, Tennessee, and became a dancer from a young age. She attended college for dance education, but dropped out to move to New York, where she worked as a dancer on Broadway, notably serving as the understudy for main antagonist Fastrada in Pippin for two years. She went on to appear in commercials for products including Sizzlean, Mr. Clean, Wonder Bread, and Folgers. She has spoken about how she didn't ever think of working out because of beauty standards when she was young.

After 25 years, struggling to find further acting jobs, she moved to the Poconos and worked as a dance teacher and in sales at a local radio station, before moving back to North Carolina.

She began working out, entering a gym for the first time at 63, after seeing her daughter, Jessie Graff, compete in American Ninja Warrior. It took her a year to become able to do a pullup. She was also inspired by her daughter to compete in American Ninja Warrior.

In her first appearance in Ninja Warrior, she fell at the first obstacle. In a later appearance, though, she became the oldest person to pass an obstacle in American Ninja Warrior, holding the Guinness World Record. As of 2026, she has competed four times. She also competes competitively in the National Senior Games.

She played Evelyn, a member of the main cheerleading troupe, in 2019 cheerleading movie Poms. She also played MawMaw in You're Cordially Invited, where she did her own stunts, and played Agnes Miller in Stars Fall On Alabama.

She is also notable for her social media, in which she shares her fitness progress and strategies. She has over 130,000 followers.
