= Chie Tanabe =

Japanese stuntwoman and "suit actor" (born 1971)

Chie Tanabe (田邊 智恵, Tanabe Chie; born March 29, 1971) is a Japanese stuntwoman and suit actress (an actress in a full-body rubber suit). She was formerly associated with Japan Enterprise Action.

== Biography ==
Tanabe's married name is Chie Nishimura (西村 智恵, Nishimura Chie).

=== Sasuke and Kunoichi Appearances ===
In 1998, she became the first woman to complete Stage 1 of Sasuke (known as Ninja Warrior franchise globally), during the 2nd Competition. She could not, however, complete the Spider Walk in Stage 2, as she was not tall enough to properly negotiate the obstacle. This accomplishment would not be matched until the 34th Competition, when Jessie Graff (another stuntwoman and frequent competitor of its United States version) surpassed the accomplishment by reaching Stage 3. Tanabe also competed in Kunoichi, the women's version of Sasuke, but failed in Stage 3 after a misstep. She initially did not plan to compete again due to her plans of having a baby, but she later competed in the 4th Competition, where she failed Stage 1's Hop Rocket, and in the 5th Competition, where she failed the first stage angle run, and in the 6th competition, where she failed on the barrel roll. On the 7th competition, she ran out of time because of losing time on the spinning log. And on the 8th competition, she failed on the first stage swing jump.

== Filmography ==
=== Actress ===
- Metropolitan Police Branch 82
- Ninja Sentai Kakuranger
- Kyuukyuu Sentai GoGo-V
- Gamble Queen

=== Suit actor ===
- Chikyuu Sentai Fiveman as Arthur G6
- Chōriki Sentai Ohranger as Tackle Boy
- Gekisou Sentai Carranger as Hazardian Dappu
- Tokusou Robo Janperson as Kyaoru (Carol)
- B-Robo Kabutack as Kabutack
- Hyper Doll as Mica Minazuki

=== Stunts ===
- Kyōryū Sentai Zyuranger
- Ie Naki Ko
- Marutai no Onna
- Sakuya Yokai-Den

=== Voice ===
- Clock Tower 3 as Rooder's Ghost
