= Sizzlean =

Former American food product

Sizzlean was a cured meat product manufactured throughout the 1970s and 1980s and marketed as a healthier alternative to bacon. Swift & Co. originally produced the product and rolled it out to major United States markets in 1977. In 1990, ConAgra Foods acquired Swift from Beatrice Foods and continued to market the product until about 2005.

Sizzlean was the subject of a series of commercials featuring the tagline: “Move over, bacon, there’s something leaner!” or “Move over, bacon, now there’s something meatier!”

Although the product contained less fat than bacon, it was still 37% fat by weight, causing complaints that the "lean" name was not accurate.

== See also ==
- Great Tastes of America with Sizzlean- A United Collection of Regional Americana Recipes (1985, Beatrice Meats)
