= Akbar Gbajabiamila =

American football player and talk show co-host

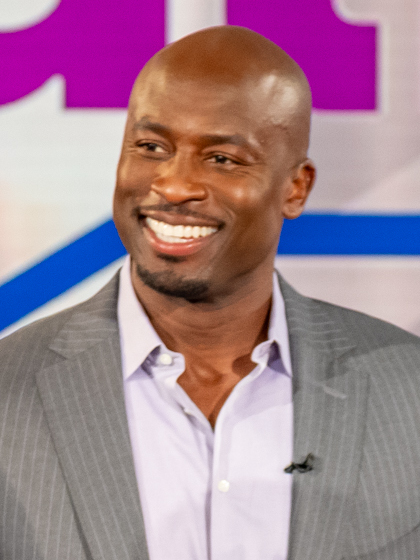
- Gbajabiamila in 2024

No. 98, 94, 93
- Position: Defensive end

Personal information
- Born: May 6, 1979 (age 47); Los Angeles, California, U.S.
- Listed height: 6 ft 5 in (1.96 m)
- Listed weight: 263 lb (119 kg)

Career information
- High school: Crenshaw (Los Angeles)
- College: San Diego State (1998–2002)
- NFL draft: 2003: undrafted

Career history
- Oakland Raiders (2003–2004); San Diego Chargers (2006); Miami Dolphins (2007); Oakland Raiders (2008)*
- * Offseason or practice squad member only

Career NFL statistics
- Total tackles: 22
- Sacks: 2
- Pass deflections: 2
- Stats at Pro Football Reference

Akbar Gbajabiamila
- Born: Los Angeles, California, U.S.
- Occupations: Sports commentator, TV personality, author, Executive Producer, former linebacker
- Website: iamakbar.com

Akbar Oluwakemi-Idowu Gbajabiamila (born May 6, 1979) is an American former professional football player in the National Football League (NFL) who is a commentator and co-host of American Ninja Warrior and its spin-off American Ninja Warrior Junior. He is also an analyst for the NFL Network, co-hosting the flagship morning show Good Morning Football (and syndicated spin-off/extension show Good Morning Football: Overtime) and was a co-host of The Talk on CBS from 2021 to 2024.

Gbajabiamila is Nigerian-American and grew up in the Crenshaw district of Los Angeles with his mother and father, both of whom were born and raised in Nigeria, and his six siblings. Among his siblings is former Green Bay Packers defensive end Kabeer Gbaja-Biamila. Before starting his professional career, Gbajabiamila played college football for the San Diego State Aztecs. He was signed by the Oakland Raiders as an undrafted free agent in 2003. Gbajabiamila also played for the San Diego Chargers and Miami Dolphins.

Gbajabiamila is also an author, having released his first book, Everyone Can Be a Ninja on May 7, 2019.

== Early life ==
Akbar Oluwakemi-Idowu Gbajabiamila (Note: Also hyphenated as Gbaja-Biamila for readability.) was born on May 6, 1979, in Los Angeles, California, to Nigerian immigrant parents. He is one of seven children. He grew up in Crenshaw District, and attended Crenshaw High School in South Los Angeles, where he was a star basketball player on teams that were part of the Willie West Jr. coaching era. He and his teammates won back-to-back City and State Championships in 1996 and 1997. Gbajabiamila moved to play football during his senior year. He was an all-league and all-conference choice. He was also named the team's defensive lineman of the year, compiling 11 sacks and 74 tackles in his senior campaign.

== College career ==
In his senior year, Gbajabiamila received scholarship offers from University of Oregon, University of California, Berkeley, San Diego State, Fresno State, and Colorado State. He chose to go to San Diego State University, where his older brother also attended. Gbajabiamila was an all-Mountain West Conference in 2002. He joined the group Athletes For Education, an outreach group that sent players into communities to work with young people on developing their life skills. He graduated with a degree in communication and new media studies, before completing a certified entrepreneurship program at the Wharton School of Business in 2005.

== Professional career ==
Pre-draft measurables
Height	Weight
6 ft 4 3/4 in (1.95 m)	268 lb (122 kg)
Values from San Diego State's Pro Day

=== Oakland Raiders ===
Gbajabiamila went undrafted in the 2003 NFL draft and later signed with the Oakland Raiders as a free agent. He made the team out of training camp and played in 13 of the team's 16 regular season games. He recorded seven tackles (four solos) on the season, with his first and only sack of the season coming against Daunte Culpepper, then with the Minnesota Vikings.

In 2004, Gbajabiamila split time between defensive end and linebacker, occasionally filling in for players such as Travian Smith and Tyler Brayton. He appeared in 14 games for the Raiders during the regular season and was inactive for two games. He accumulated a career-high 14 tackles (11 solo) and added a sack on the year. That sack came against Brad Johnson and the Tampa Bay Buccaneers, while he recorded a season-high three tackles in games against the Denver Broncos and Jacksonville Jaguars. Gbajabiamila also recovered a blocked punt against the Carolina Panthers which led to a Raiders touchdown.

Battling injuries during the 2005 training camp, Gbajabiamila was released by the Raiders on September 3. He had a workout with the Green Bay Packers two days later, but he was not signed and spent the season out of football.

=== San Diego Chargers ===
Gbajabiamila returned to the NFL in 2006 after being signed by the San Diego Chargers on January 12. His skills and size was a fit for the 3-4 defense employed by then-defensive coordinator Wade Phillips and the Chargers.

=== Miami Dolphins ===
On February 6, 2007, it was announced that Gbajabiamila had been signed to a future contract worth $7.4 million with the Miami Dolphins. The move reunited him with new Dolphins head coach Cam Cameron, who was the offensive coordinator in San Diego the season before when Gbaja-Biamila was a member of the Chargers. On September 11, 2007, he was released by the Dolphins after appearing in one game. He spent the season out of football.

=== Oakland Raiders (second stint) ===
Gbajabiamila briefly returned to the Raiders in 2008, but did not appear in a game and was released before the start of the season.

=== Other ===
In 2005, Gbajabiamila was selected as one of the NFL's first athletes into their Broadcast Boot Camp, held in Mount Laurel, N.J., and designed to give 20 players a short and rigorous look into the skills needed to embark on a broadcast or journalism career after their playing careers. He also took advantage of some time between playing stints to volunteer at KSWB, the NBC affiliate in San Diego, and ended up as the co-host for Football Night in San Diego. He hosted the show for two and a half seasons (2006–2008) before getting one last shot in the NFL with the Miami Dolphins.

== Television career ==
With his playing career over, Gbajabiamila turned his focus to the broadcast booth in addition to his philanthropic work, serving as an analyst for the Mtn. Network and CBS Sports Network for two years, while also taking voice and acting classes. He also founded Rush The Passer, a year-round athletic, academic, and life skills program for youth in Southern California.

In 2010 he was approached by reality producer Mark Burnett to be part of a three-man athlete team for his latest project on ABC, Expedition Impossible. His team "The Football Players" finished in 4th place on the show. That role, and the exposure that came with it, helped further Akbar's exposure.

As of 2012, he has joined the NFL Network as a member of the NFL Fantasy Live cast of hosts. In 2013, he became a color commentator alongside Matt Iseman for American Ninja Warrior being broadcast on G4, Esquire Network, and NBC. The pair also co-hosts Team Ninja Warrior, a spin-off of American Ninja Warrior that debuted on Esquire Network in 2016, and American Ninja Warrior Junior together on Universal Kids in 2018. The duo provide their voices as themselves in American Ninja Warrior: Challenge.

On May 10, 2018, Gbajabiamila threw out the first pitch at Citizens Bank Park before a game between the San Francisco Giants and Philadelphia Phillies. The pitch was heavily criticized.

On September 2, 2021, it was announced that Akbar Gbajabiamila would join The Talk as a permanent co-host, and the second full-time male co-host on the show. Gbajabiamila appeared as a guest co-host on multiple episodes in June and July.

In 2024 Gbajabiamila co-hosted the "Stanley Pup," a special produced to air alongside the Stanley Cup playoffs. The program promoted pet adoption while showing 16 puppies with each dog representing one of the NHL 2024 playoff teams.

== Personal life ==
=== Family and religion ===
Akbar is married and has four children. His wife is Chrystal Gbajabiamila. His ancestry is Nigerian of Yoruba ethnicity. Both of his parents were Muslim, until his mother converted to Christianity. He was raised in a Sunni Muslim household but converted to Christianity while in college. In 2000, his father, Mustapha, was diagnosed with Parkinson's disease. In 2002, his mother, Bolatito, died in a car crash. While a member of the Chargers in 2006, Akbar routinely drove back and forth from San Diego to Los Angeles to spend time with his father. He is the cousin of Chief of Staff to the President of Nigeria Femi Gbajabiamila.

=== Charity ===
Gbajabiamila currently serves as a board member for the Asomugha Foundation, an organization aimed at creating better educational opportunities for impoverished communities. Akbar also serves on the board of the Michael J. Fox Foundation, which raises millions of dollars for Parkinson's research.

== Notes ==
Media offices
Preceded by Elaine Welteroth	The Talk co-host 2021-2024	Incumbent
