= Ninja Warrior (franchise) =

Japanese sports entertainment game show

- Created by: Masato Inui
- Original work: Sasuke
- Owner: Tokyo Broadcasting System
- Years: 1997–present

Films and television
- Television series: Ninja Warrior (see international versions)

Miscellaneous
- Genre: Sports entertainment Obstacle course
- First aired: 27 September 1997; 29 years ago

Ninja Warrior is a sports entertainment and reality television franchise that began airing in 1997, and has since aired in 157 countries and been adapted in a total of 26 countries. The series began as a segment called Sasuke on the show Kinniku Banzuke. It began airing internationally in 2005 which led to massive expansion and widespread success. Adaptations began planning immediately, with American Ninja Challenge, Sasuke Malaysia and Sasuke Singapore being the first small-scale adaptations which sent their winners over to Japan. The first large scale adaptation was the fourth season of American Ninja Warrior in 2012, with twenty-two more adaptations launching between 2014 and 2019.

In Ninja Warrior, a group of competitors attempt to complete a four-stage obstacle course. Falling any obstacle, falling in the water, running out of time or losing a head-to-head race results in the competitor being eliminated. Many seasons operate an additional qualification system where as many as 1000 hopefuls take on a series of one to five qualification heats to earn a spot in the finals course.

== History ==
=== 1997–2006: Sasuke and Kunoichi ===
During the 1996 run of Kinniku Banzuke, a small event called Spider Walk appeared. The course featured a short, 9 obstacle time trial based on the Ninja skill of stealthily walking between walls in alleyways and hallways. Later in 1997, following the debut of the first multi-stage course Hand Walk Tower, assistant producer Masato Inui was tasked with creating a larger, multi-stage course that expanded upon Spider Walk to cover a full array of other ninja skills. Despite being intended as a one-time event, the heavy success of Sasuke led to its ongoing renewal with a new tournament every six months, as well as a full array of spinoffs, most notably with Kunoichi, an all-women's season.

After Kinniku Banzuke ended in 2002, and its sequel Taiiku World ended in 2003, Sasuke and Kunoichi were launched as standalone specials which have continued ever since.

=== 2007–2019: international expansion ===
In Summer 2007, G4 launched American Ninja Challenge, a reality show where contestants could audition and take part in a series of challenges to win a spot on Sasuke. After four successful seasons, interest in America grew high enough that G4 decided to ramp up production. 2009 saw the debut season of American Ninja Warrior, where hundreds of competitors competed in shorter preliminary stages to win one of ten spots in Sasuke's 23rd tournament.

In November 2011, Ushio Higuchi's Monster9 filed for bankruptcy as a result of financial mismanagement, legal disputes and settlements with stage acrobat group Muscle Musical and plummeting viewership. As a result, Sasuke, Kunoichi and Sportsman No. 1 all went into hiatus during legal proceedings, and were subsequently cancelled by TBS. As a result of this cancellation, G4 made the decision that for the first time ever, they would host their own full scale tournament in Las Vegas, and as a result American Ninja Warrior's fourth season saw 100 competitors complete a course in the US, with Japan cut out of the format. Due to the higher production costs, G4 decided to move the program to NBC to attract higher viewership. This new format was a massive success, however G4 would shut down at the end of 2014, two years after an end to Japanese Sasuke broadcasts in the United States.

Behind the scenes, the success of American Ninja Warrior led TBS to believe they could market the series to a much wider audience, and the idea of the ASEAN Open Cup was conceived. Sasuke would expand into ASEAN countries which would feature shorter courses and special events, which would then act as qualifiers for Sasuke. The project was piloted with the launch of Sasuke Singapore and Sasuke Malaysia in 2012, sporting half length 1st Stage courses followed by the Final Stage tower. The first ASEAN Open Cup was held in Malaysia featuring teams from ASEAN regions, Japan and the United States, giving competitors a chance to win a spot on Sasuke. Following this event, interest died off, and the ASEAN Open Cup was discontinued as a failure.

Despite the previous failure to expand into ASEAN countries, 2015 saw massive expansion through Europe and Asia, with localized versions being produced in China, Denmark, Indonesia, Sweden, Turkey, the United Kingdom and Vietnam. This trend continued with France, Germany and Italy in 2016; Austria, Australia, Egypt, Hungary, Netherlands, Russia and Spain in 2017; and Israel, Romania and Switzerland in 2018. 2017 additionally saw a full reboot of Kunoichi, featuring redesigned courses more akin to Sasuke.

In the United States, NBC decided to expand the portfolio of the series by creating several spinoffs. The international crossover series American Ninja Warrior: USA vs. The World featured top competitors from each international version competing in a head to head competition. Team Ninja Warrior saw teams of three racing against other members for the fastest times. American Ninja Warrior Junior featured kids racing each other for the fastest times. These formats proved popular and saw their own international adaptations in China, Denmark, France, Germany, Israel and Vietnam.

In Japan, Ushio Higuchi had created a new company called GoldEggs following the dissolution of Monster9, and in 2017 attempted to launch his own unlicensed successor to Viking called KuroOvi: The Ultimate Hero. He would once again use Sasuke and Kinniku Banzuke content in an attempt to promote his series, as well as featuring many competitors from Sasuke, Viking, and Kunoichi. The series would also feature simultaneously released English dubs. The series was a financial failure, with the English broadcast being cancelled after only one month due to an average viewership of under 150 views per episode.

2019 saw new versions licensed in Mongolia and Poland, which to date are the most recently produced new adaptations of Ninja Warrior.

=== 2019–2025: format variations, COVID-19 and IOC certification ===
By 2019, more than 60% of the international adaptations that had been produced had already ended, with the high costs of production compared to viewership being a primary factor. The situation worsened significantly following the outbreak of the COVID-19 pandemic, when production was suspended globally on large scale TV series. American Ninja Warrior's 12th season featured modified rules and courses to distance competitors, while the remaining global seasons were postponed until late 2020 or into 2021. The change in market and year away from broadcasting significantly impacted viewership, with returning series seeing greatly reduced ratings across the board, leading to many series being cancelled after 2022. Additionally, productions in Israel and Russia ceased due to the 2022 Ukraine invasion and 2022 Gaza–Israel clashes. By mid 2023, only five countries had series in active production: Japan, the United States, France, Germany and Poland.

In order to regain interest in the series, many adaptations began introducing changes to the format. American Ninja Warrior introduced twists such as the Safety Pass, Speed Pass, Power Tower and side by side racing – all changes that would be seen extensively abroad in the 2020s. Sasuke would remain the only series that remained true to the roots of the series.

Following the failure of KuroOvi, GoldEggs sought to create a chain of ninja gyms across Japan titled Ninja Park, which would additionally host in-person competitions under the banner Ninjathlon. As part of this process, GoldEggs would file trademark ownership claims over several iconic Sasuke obstacles in both Japan and the United States. While unsuccessful in the US, Higuchi and GoldEggs were able to successfully claim six obstacles in Japan. As a result, beginning in Sasuke's 40th tournament, several obstacles were renamed to avoid legal injunctions, most notably with the Spider Walk being renamed to Spider Run, and Cliffhanger Dimension being renamed to Cliff Dimension. The trademark registration for the Spider Walk was rejected on November 8, 2022.

Following the conclusion of the 2020 Summer Olympics in 2021, the Union Internationale de Pentathlon Moderne (UIPM) voted to remove Equestrian from the Modern Pentathlon following concerns of Animal rights. Due to extremely low viewership, the UIPM aimed to bring in a new discipline that would make the event more appealing to viewers. Following several rounds of testing and votes, the UIPM voted to add obstacle racing to the modern pentathlon beginning with the 2028 Summer Olympics. The course would be standardized and obstacles would be licensed directly from Sasuke and TBS, finally fulfilling Ushio Higuchi's initial dream of creating a new sport after 35 years. Conversely, Sasuke's 39th tournament debuted a new final stage featuring a Speed climbing zone, with a layout variant of the normal standard. (Note: In that tournament, no competitions advanced to the final stage, so the Speed Climbing was hidden by a black cloth and its entirety was not revealed, only that Narazaki and Noguchi were its supervisors.)

Due to Japan's success in winning 3 Gold, 1 Silver and 1 Bronze in Skateboarding during its debut at the 2020 Summer Olympics, TBS launched Kasso four months prior to the 2024 Summer Olympics to build up hype for the event. Kasso is an official spinoff that fuses Sasuke's format with skateboarding in the style of Skeboarder from Kinniku Banzuke. While the show was a failure in Japan and was cancelled shortly after broadcast, the first tournament netted an unexpected 6 million views internationally within one year, prompting the immediate revival and international licensing of the series by TBS. A second tournament also resonated around the world. Kasso's first overseas event, titled Kasso Fest: Skate and Sound, gained immense popularity globally.

Following this announcement, TBS would invest heavily into the Sasuke brand. In 2024, TBS broadcast the first ever Sasuke World Cup shortly after the 2024 Summer Olympics, featuring a total of 35 top ninja competitors from Australia, France, Germany, Japan and the United States. In January 2025, TBS rebooted Kunoichi and Sasuke Junior. In March 2025, TBS debuted a new spinoff format called Hanzo that brought in elements of swimming, shooting, fencing and running to align the format more closely with the Modern Pentathlon. American Ninja Warrior and Ninja Warrior Poland would both alter the formats of their 2025 seasons to feature side-by-side racing brackets similar to the IOC standard instead of the original Survival Attack format, an element that was previously seen on Ninja Warrior UK's sixth season.

=== 2025–present: franchise reboots ===
Beginning in 2024, renewed interest in the series began with discussions occurring to expand the franchise into new regions. During the Media City Qatar conference in May 2025, series lead Masato Inui confirmed they were planning to expand Ninja Warrior into a more globally connected franchise with networks helping each other and collaborating.

Since 2025, several international versions of Sasuke/Ninja Warrior announced their return after a long time hitatus, such as Vietnam, Israel and Australia. However, in the same year, Polsat announced that the Polish version of Ninja Warrior will be cancelled after 12 seasons. By mid 2026, only six countries had series in active production: Japan, the United States, Australia, Germany, Israel and Vietnam.

On October 7, 2025, TBS announced a licensing agreement with Banijay Entertainment under which it will hold the international rights to the Ninja Warrior format, outside territories where there already active versions of the franchise (including Asia, France, Germany, Poland, and the United States).

In March 2026, TBS debuted new crossover spinoff format called Musou that mixed the format of Sasuke, Kunoichi and other TBS physical gameshows such as Takeshi's Castle, Sports Danshi Grand Prix, DOORS and Tokyo Friend Park.

== Format ==
=== Course structure ===
Ninja Warrior consists of four stages of increasing difficulty; as well as a handful of preliminary rounds used to determine which competitors will appear in the finals. The object is to hit the buzzer at the end of each course before the allotted time expires. If a competitor goes out of bounds, runs out of time or comes into contact with the water in any of the pits below the course, they are eliminated from the competition.

=== Preliminary Rounds ===
In most seasons, preliminary rounds consist of a short, 6 obstacle course ending in the warped wall. This round will allow a set amount of competitors to advance, although will allow more than that amount to advance if there are more clears than expected. Some recent seasons will additionally specify a set amount of female competitors who will advance on their own leaderboard.

After this is typically a semifinal round, where a course modeled roughly after the second stage, and often containing a salmon ladder will follow the same rules. In America, the semifinals course attaches the salmon ladder and additional obstacles to the end of the first preliminary course and has competitors attempt them back-to-back.

=== First stage ===
The First Stage primarily tests one's general athletic abilities, with a focus on balance, agility, and speed. While obstacles change from season to season, the course always generally features the following structure, both on Sasuke and abroad:

- An opening segment featuring a "step" obstacle such as the Quadruple Steps, a "sliding" obstacle such as the Log Grip and a balance obstacle.
- Since 2000, the Warped Wall or a variation of it will appear in this stage.
- Since 2000, trampoline obstacles are almost always present.
- Since 2015, a power-based obstacle Tackle presented to drain competitors' stamina before Warped Wall.
- Most obstacles are ground based obstacles, or fluid swinging obstacles.

==== Split-stage Format ====
In 2015, a variant of the First Stage, called Split-stage Format appeared in Vietnam only. This stage was split into two courses labeled Stage 1A (right-handed course) and Stage 1B (left-handed course). Competitors must always face six obstacles, with the first two obstacles being the same, but the final four obstacles varying from split course to split course, and only the producer would decide which competitors run Stage 1A, and which Stage 1B, similar to the Preliminary Rounds format.

=== Second stage ===
Those with enough skill to complete Stage One then take on an even more grueling set of obstacles in Stage Two, which typically has a shorter time limit, and a focus on lache and balance based upper body obstacles.

While obstacles change from season to season, the course always generally features the following structure, both on Sasuke and abroad:

- Since 2001, the first obstacle has been a "sliding" obstacle, such as Chain Reaction.
- In most series, an upper body balance obstacle revolving around grip and stability such as Metal Spin or Unstable Bridge was present mid-stage.
- Since 2007, the Salmon Ladder has been present as the 2nd or 3rd obstacle.
- Historically, the 2nd Stage has ended with Wall Lift, or a variation of it.

=== Third stage ===
The Third Stage has no overall time limit unlike the other stages, however there is a resting time limit that specifies the maximum amount of time a competitor may wait between obstacles. This varies between 30 and 120 seconds depending on the season. In each rest area, competitors can apply "sticky spray" to improve their grip. While the first two stages focus on speed and agility, this course almost exclusively tests one's upper body strength and stamina.

While obstacles change from season to season, the course always generally features the following structure, both on Sasuke and abroad:

- An opening obstacle with a very low fail rate that exists only to burn stamina, such as Propeller Bars, Rumbling Dice and Drum Hopper.
- Since 2002, An obstacle that features grip based transfers between stationary objects, such as Lamp Grasper, Devil Steps, Floating Boards, Sidewinder, or Swing Edge.
- Since 1999, Cliffhanger, or its variants.
- Since 2007, a harder grip area, such as Spider Flip, Hang Climb, or Vertical Limit.
- A final dismount from a ring or bar, such as Pipe Slider or Flying Bar.

=== Final stage ===
The goal of the Final Stage is to reach and hit the button at the top of a 15-30m tower before time expires. Reaching the top is referred to as kanzenseiha (完全制覇), translated roughly as "Total Victory". The Final Stage's time limit is between 30 and 45 seconds. (Note: The time limit depends on the obstacles in a given season and the level of the competitors. The licensor makes the decision on the time limit.)

The original Final Stage was a Rope Climb with a 30 second time limit, which has been used in many international adaptations. (Note: Some regions will extend or reduce the time limit from the usual 30 seconds. Some regions like France will also adjust the time limit to the record by the previous winner if anyone reaches the top.)

The second main variant sees a two section final with the bottom being a momentum based climb on Spider Climb or Ladders, and the upper being a Rope Climb. The Spider Climb and Rope variant has been used in many Asian adaptations such as Indonesia, Malaysia and Vietnam.

In 2016, a new version of the Final Stage featured three sections, adding an extra tall Salmon Ladder between the Spider Climb and the Rope Climb. In Germany since 2024, this was adapted to only have a Salmon Ladder and Rope.

In 2021, Japan debuted a new Final Stage with a variant of the IFSC standard Speed Climbing wall replacing Spider Climb, 57% the height of the normal speed climbing standard. (Note: Supervised by Tomoa Narasaki and Akiyo Noguchi.)

=== Racing ===
In the 2020s several series began incorporating elements of head-to-head racing into the courses. Initially these appeared in the preliminary rounds, with later seasons making either the first or second stage a race. Some regions like Poland have opted to shift their entire season to racing, including the Final Stage.

== Ninja Warrior around the world ==
Below is a complete list of the countries with their own international adaptation of Sasuke/Ninja Warrior.

This list includes all officially licensed series, as well as unofficial series. Officially licensed series must be via TBS, while unofficial series must specifically have a significant and unmistaken overlap in the format and obstacles to be eligible form inclusion, and should have connections with Sasuke or Ninja Warrior via direct mentions, footage, succession, competitor overlap or legal dispute. In addition, the broadcasts must have been a made-for-tv series, meaning that broadcasts of public events and league competitions will not be included.

For an overview of all international seasons, see List of Ninja Warrior seasons.

For a list of the best performances each season, see List of best results on Ninja Warrior.

A Airing: Currently airing franchise
R Renewed: Franchise with an upcoming season/version
F Forthcoming: Franchise that has been announced but has not broadcast yet
E Ended: Franchise no longer airing
P Pending: No official renewal or cancellation has occurred
U Unofficial: A former series that was not licensed via TBS

=== Core installments ===
| Status | Country/Region | Local title | Abbrev. | Seasons (Upcoming) | Network | Presenter(s) (Seasons) | Premiered |
|---|---|---|---|---|---|---|---|
| Ended | Arab world | Ninja Warriorبالعربي; Ninja Warrior bel-arabi | (Egypt) NWBA | 1 | ON E | Ahmed Fahmi; Jennifer Aazar | 27 March 2017 |
| Renewed | Australia | Australian Ninja Warrior (1–4, 6-7); Australian Ninja Warrior: Midoriyama's Revenge (5) | (Australia) AuNW | 6 (7) | Nine Network | Rebecca Maddern (1–5); Ben Fordham (1–5); Andrew 'Freddie' Flintoff (1–4); Shane Crawford (4–5); Jim Courier (6); Leila McKinnon (6); Will & Woody (6) | 9 July 2017 |
| Renewed | Australia | Australian Ninja Warrior (1–4, 6-7); Australian Ninja Warrior: Midoriyama's Revenge (5) | (Australia) AuNW | 6 (7) | Network 10 | Robert Irwin (7); Georgie Tunny (7); Beau Ryan (7) | 2027 |
| Ended | Austria | Ninja Warrior Austria | (Austria) NWAT | 3 | Puls 4 | Dori Bauer; Mario Hochgerner; Florian Knöchl | 24 October 2017 |
| Forthcoming | Cambodia | Mekong Legend | (Cambodia) MKL | 0 (1) | Hang Meas HDTV | | TBA |
| Ended | China | 极限勇士Sasuke: X Warrior; Ultimate Warrior | (China) SXW | 1 | Jiangsu TV | Shi Zhenghan; Ma Li; Su Dong; Zhang Chunye | 9 June 2015 |
| Unofficial | China | 全能极限王; Challenge the Limit | (China) CTL | 1 | Zhejiang TV | | 15 July 2015 |
| Unofficial | China | 奥运向前冲; Olympic Forward | (China) OLF | 2 | Hunan TV | | 3 June 2008 |
| Unofficial | Costa Rica | Force Masters: The Challenge | (Costa Rica) FMTC | 1 | Teletica | Bismarck Méndez; Paola Chacón | 19 February 2023 |
| Ended | Denmark | Danmarks Ninja Warrior | (Denmark) DNW | 1 | Kanal 5 | Pelle Hvenegaard; Christiane Schaumburg-Müller; Kian Fonoudi | 7 September 2015 |
| Pending | France | Ninja Warrior: Le Parcours des héros (1–7, 9); Ninja Warrior: Face Aux Légendes (8) | (France) LPDH | 9 | TF1 | Denis Brogniart (1–); Christophe Beaugrand (1–); Sandrine Quétier (1–2); Iris Mittenaere (3–8); Anaïs Grangerac (9) | 8 July 2016 |
| Airing | Germany | Ninja Warrior Germany | (Germany) NWG | 11 (12) | RTL | Laura Wontorra (1–10); Jan Köppen; Frank Buschmann (1–10); Anna Fleischhauer (11–); Wolff-Christoph Fuss (11–) | 9 July 2016 |
| Ended | Hungary | Ninja Warrior Hungary | (Hungary) NWH | 3 | TV2 | Attila Till (1–); Péter Majoros (1); Vivien Mádai (1); Tibor Kasza (2); Luca Stohl (2); Zoltán Szujó (3–); Ramóna Lékai-Kiss (3–) | 16 October 2017 |
| Ended | Indonesia | Sasuke Ninja Warrior Indonesia | (Indonesia) SNWI | 2 | RCTI | Fadi Iskandar (1–); Pica Priscilla (1); Sere Kalina (2) | 20 December 2015 |
| Unofficial | Iran | قهرمان; Ghahreman (Hero) | (Iran) GHA | 3 | IRIB TV3 | | 23 March 2023 |
| Renewed | Israel | נינג'ה ישראל; Ninja Israel (1–4); Ninja Israel: Dueling Season (5) | (Israel) NIL | 5 (6) | Keshet 12 | Assi Azar; Rotem Sela; Niv Raskin; Rotem Israel (1–3); Yarden Gerbi (4–); Yuval Shemla (5-) | 25 July 2018 |
| Ended | Italy | Ninja Warrior Italia | (Italy) NWIT | 1 | NOVE | Federico Russo; Carolina Di Domenico; Massimiliano Rosolino; Gabriele Corsi | 17 October 2016 |
| Renewed | Japan | Sasuke | (Japan) SSK | 43 (44) | TBS | | 27 September 1997 |
| Ended | Malaysia | Sasuke Malaysia | (Malaysia) SMY | 2 | TV9 | | 3 June 2012 |
| Ended | Mongolia | Монгол Нинжа дайчид Sasuke | (Mongolia) MNWS | 1 | MNB | | 29 September 2019 |
| Ended | Netherlands | Ninja Warrior NL | (Netherlands) NWNL | 1 | SBS 6 | Kim-Lian; Dennis van der Geest; Jack van Gelder | 9 March 2017 |
| Ended | Poland | Ninja Warrior Polska (1–9); Ninja vs Ninja Polska (10–12) | (Poland) NWP | 12 | Polsat | Aleksandra Szwed (1); Karolina Gilon (2–10); Marta Ćwiertniewicz (11–12); Łukasz Jurkowski; Jerzy Mielewski | 3 September 2019 |
| Ended | Romania | Ninja Warrior România | (Romania) NWRO | 1 | Pro TV | Daniel Nițoiu; Raluca Aprodu; Costi Mocanu | 9 September 2018 |
| Ended | Russia | Русский ниндзя Ninja Warrior; Russian Ninja Warrior | (Russia) RNNW | 2 | Channel One Russia | Yevgeny Savin; Timur Solovyov; Yulianna Karaulova | 26 November 2017 |
| Ended | Russia | Русский ниндзя Russian Ninja | (Russia) RNNW | 1 | STS | Vasily Artemyev; Morgenstern; Ida Galich | 22 November 2021 |
| Pending | Russia; Central Asia; Eastern Europe | Суперниндзя; Super Ninja (1–2) (Note: Суперниндзя is an unlicensed continuation of the officially licensed series Русский ниндзя.); Super Ninja - International (3); Super Ninja - Revenge (4) | (Russia) SUN | 4 | STS | | 13 February 2023 |
| Unofficial | Serbia | Vitezovi iz Blata; Mud Knights | (Serbia) VIB | 1 | RTV Pink | | 1 October 2011 |
| Ended | Singapore | Sasuke Singapore | (Singapore) SSG | 2 | Mediacorp Channel 5 | Mike Kasem; Hamish Brown; Joanne Peh | 9 August 2012 |
| Unofficial | South Korea | 출발 드림팀: 복합장애물경기; Dream Team: Complex Obstacle Race | (South Korea) COR | 7 | KBS 2TV | | 29 August 1999 |
| Ended | Spain | Ninja Warrior España | (Spain) NWES | 2 | Antena 3 | Arturo Valls (1–2); Manolo Lama (1–2); Patricia Montero (2); Pilar Rubio (1) | 9 June 2017 |
| Ended | Sweden | Ninja Warrior Sverige | (Sweden) NWSV | 2 | Kanal 5 | Adam Alsing; Mårten Nylén; Karin Frick | 29 January 2015 |
| Ended | Switzerland | Ninja Warrior Switzerland | (Switzerland) NWSW | 2 | TV24 | Nina Havel; Maximilian Baumann | 16 October 2018 |
| Ended | Thailand | เกมหิน พลังนินจา; Stone of Ninja Power | (Thailand) SNP | 1 | RTA5 | | 7 April 2009 |
| Forthcoming | Thailand | Ninja Warrior Thailand | (Thailand) NWTH | 0 (1) | Ch7HD | | TBA |
| Ended | Turkey | Ninja Warrior Türkiye | (Turkey) NWTU | 2 | TV8 | Hanzade Ofluoğlu; Jess Molho; Hakan Akdoğan; Fikret Engin; Murat Özari | 17 September 2014 |
| Ended | United Kingdom | Ninja Warrior UK (1–5); Ninja Warrior UK: Race for Glory (6) | (United Kingdom) NWUK | 6 | ITV | Ben Shephard; Rochelle Humes; Chris Kamara | 11 April 2015 |
| Ended | United States | American Ninja Challenge | (United States) ANC | 4 | G4 | | 11 November 2007 |
| Pending | United States | American Ninja Warrior | (United States) ANW | 18 (20) | G4 (2009–2013); NBC (2012–present); Esquire Network (2014–2016); USA Network (2017–2018); Telemundo (2020, in Spanish) | Blair Herter (1); Alison Haislip (1–3); Matt Iseman (2–); Jimmy Smith (2–3); Jonny Moseley (4); Angela Sun (4); Akbar Gbaja-Biamila (5–); Jenn Brown (5–6); Kristine Leahy (7–10); Zuri Hall (11–) | 12 December 2009 |
| Renewed | Vietnam | Không giới hạn – Sasuke Việt Nam | (Vietnam) SVN | 5 (6) | VTV3 | Thành Trung (1-5); Hoàng Yến Chibi (5); Minh Xù (4); Tuyền Tăng (4); Phạm Anh Khoa (3); Thiều Bảo Trang (3); Nguyên Khang (1-2); Diệp Lâm Anh (1-2); Lại Văn Sâm (1) | 18 June 2015 |

Bahrain had an officially licensed course for an in-person event, but was never recorded, so it was not included above. Licensing discussions have begun for versions in Greece, Mexico and Latin America, however no contract has been signed.

=== Spin-off series and specials ===
Below is a complete list of the spinoffs of Sasuke/Ninja Warrior.

| Status | Country/Region | Local title | Abbrev. | Format | Seasons (Upcoming) | Network | Presenter(s) (Seasons) | Premiered |
|---|---|---|---|---|---|---|---|---|
Individual Tournament Formats
| Ended | Germany | Ninja Warrior Germany: All Stars | (Germany) GAS | Racing Bracket | 2 | RTL | | 4 April 2021 |
| Pending | Japan | Kunoichi (1–11); Kunoichi: Women's Sasuke (12–) | (Japan) KNI | Women Only | 13 | TBS | | 21 December 2001 |
| Unofficial | Japan | KuroOvi | (Japan) KOO | Tournament | 1 | Family Gekijo | | 18 February 2018 |
| Ended | Japan | パンクラチオン: POWER版SASUKE; Panctratium: Power Sasuke | (Japan) PPS | Strongman | 2 | TBS | | 27 April 2004 |
| Ended | Japan | Sasuke Senior (Senior Only) | (Japan) SSR | Trial | 1 | TBS | | 14 June 2003 |
| Ended | Japan | Sasuke限定ステージ; Sasuke Special Stage (Olympians Only) | (Japan) SSS | Trial | 1 | TBS | | 31 December 2024 |
| Unofficial | Japan | バイキング; Viking: The Ultimate Obstacle Course | (Japan) VIK | Tournament (1–3); Racing Bracket (4) | 7 | FujiTV | | 22 March 2005 |
| Ended | Japan | HANZO (Pentathlon) | (Japan) HNZ | Tournament | 1 | TBS | | 24 March 2025 |
| Pending | Japan | MUSOU | (Japan) MSU | Tournament | 1 | TBS | | 23 March 2026 |
| Ended | Indonesia | Sasuke Ninja Warrior Indonesia: International Competition | (Indonesia) IIC | International | 1 | RCTI | Daniel Mananta | 25 November 2017 |
| Ended | Indonesia | Sasuke Ninja Warrior Indonesia: Misi Operasi Midoriyama | (Indonesia) IOM | Military Only | 2 | RCTI | | 3 May 2016 |
| Ended | Indonesia | Sasuke Ninja Warrior Indonesia: Spesial Polri | (Indonesia) ISP | Police Only | 1 | RCTI | | 15 October 2017 |
| Pending | United States | American Ninja Warrior: Women's Championship | (United States) AWC | Women Only | 6 Specials | NBC | | 9 May 2021 |
Kids Tournament Formats
| Ended | Germany | Ninja Warrior Germany Kids | (Germany) GKI | Elimination | 2 | Super RTL | | 17 July 2020 |
| Pending | Germany | Ninja Warrior Kids Academy | (Germany) GKA | Reality | 1 | Super RTL | Jessica Schöne | 12 October 2025 |
| Ended | Israel | נינג'ה ישראל ילדים; Ninja Israel Kids | (Israel) NIC | Tournament | 1 | Keshet 12 | | 11 November 2019 |
| Ended | Japan | Sasuke Junior | (Japan) SJR | Tournament (1–5); Trial (6) | 6 | TBS | | 4 July 1998 |
| Pending | Japan | Sasuke Junior Cup | (Japan) SJC | Racing Bracket | 2 | YouTube (TBS) | | 24 January 2025 |
| Pending | Russia | Суперниндзя. Дети; Super Ninja Kids | (Russia) SNK | Bracket | 3 | STS | | 5 May 2024 |
| Unofficial | Thailand | ภารกิจเด็กแกร่ง; Kids Stronger | (Thailand) KSTH | Tournaments (1); Bracket (2) | 2 | MCOT HD | | 15 September 2018 |
| Ended | United States | American Ninja Warrior Junior | (United States) AJR | Racing Bracket | 3 | Universal Kids | Matt Iseman; Akbar Gbaja-Biamila; Laurie Hernandez | 13 October 2018 |
Team Tournament Formats
| Ended | Australia | Australian Ninja Warrior: State of Origin | (Australia) ASO | Heat | 1 Specials | Nine Network | | 16 August 2020 |
| Ended | Denmark | Team Ninja Warrior Danmark | (Denmark) TNWD | Racing Heat | 1 | Kanal 5 | | 4 September 2016 |
| Ended | Germany | Team Ninja Warrior Germany | (Germany) TNWG | Racing Heat | 2 | RTL | | 22 April 2018 |
| Ended | Israel | Ninja Israel: All Stars | (Israel) IAS | Racing Heat | 2 Specials | Keshet 12 | | 22 March 2021 |
| Ended | Israel | Ninja Israel: Battle of the Hosts | (Israel) IBH | Racing Heat | 1 Special | Keshet 12 | | 8 April 2023 |
| Ended | Japan | 愛犬サスケ (AikenSasuke); Super Dog (Dog) | (Japan) INS | Trial (1–3); Tournament (4) | 4 | TBS | | 13 October 2001 |
| Ended | Japan | インテリドッグ (IntelliDog); Intelligent Dog (Dog) | (Japan) IND | Tournament | 2 | TBS | | 3 May 2003 |
| Unofficial | Japan | ドギーメイズ; Doggie Maze (Dog) | (Japan) DGM | Trial | 1 | TV Asahi | | 13 June 2007 |
| Unofficial | Japan | ドッグアドベンチャー; Dog Adventure (Dog) | (Japan) DAV | Trial | 1 | TV Asahi | | 8 January 2008 |
| Unofficial | Japan | バイキング: プレミアム; Viking Premium (Pair Viking) (Pair) | (Japan) PVK | Tournament | 3 | FujiTV | | 3 August 2005 |
| Unofficial | South Korea | 슈퍼바이킹; Super Viking (Pair) | (South Korea) SVK | Tournament | 2 | SBS | | 4 November 2006 |
| Ended | United States | American Ninja Warrior: Ninja vs. Ninja (formerly Team Ninja Warrior) | (United States) NVN | Racing Heat | 3 | USA Network | Matt Iseman; Akbar Gbaja-Biamila; Alex Curry; Kacy Catanzaro (College Madness) | 19 January 2016 |
| Ended | United States | American Ninja Warrior: Family Championship | (United States) AFC | Bracket | 1 Special | NBC | | 5 September 2022 |
| Ended | United States | American Ninja Warrior: Couples Championship | (United States) ACC | Elimination | 2 Specials | NBC | | 18 September 2023 |
| Ended | Vietnam | Sasuke Vietnam: Team Competition | (Vietnam) VTC | Heat | 1 Special | VTV3 | Thành Trung; Phạm Anh Khoa; Thiều Bảo Trang | 7 September 2017 |
International Team Tournament Formats
| Ended | China | X Warrior: International Competition | (China) XIC | Heat | 4 Specials | Jiangsu TV | | 13 October 2015 |
| Ended | France | Ninja Warrior: Le Choc des Nations | (France) LCDN | Heat | 1 | TF1 | | 12 July 2024 |
| Ended | Germany | Ninja Warrior Germany: 4 Nationen Special | (Germany) G4N | Heat | 3 Specials | RTL | | 25 November 2018 |
| Pending | Japan | Sasuke World Cup | (Japan) SWC | Heat | 2 | TBS | | 21 August 2024 |
| Ended | Singapore | Sasuke Singapore: Face-Off | (Singapore) SFO | Heat | 1 Special | Mediacorp Channel 5 | | 28 November 2012 |
| Ended | United States | American Ninja Warrior: USA vs the World (formerly USA vs Japan) | (United States) UWV | Heat | 7 Specials | NBC | | 13 January 2014 |
| Ended | Vietnam | Sasuke Vietnam: All Stars | (Vietnam) VAS | Heat | 4 Specials | VTV3 | Lại Văn Sâm; Nguyên Khang; Diệp Lâm Anh; Thành Trung; Liêu Hà Trinh; Minh Xù; Hoàng Yến Chibi; Hoàng Oanh | 10 September 2015 |
Skills Exhibition Formats
| Ended | Australia | Australian Ninja Warrior: Record Breakers | (Australia) ARB | Skills | 2 Specials | Nine Network | | 7 July 2021 |
| Ended | United States | American Ninja Warrior: All Stars | (United States) AAS | Skills | 6 Specials | NBC | | 29 May 2016 |
Celebrity Charity Formats
| Pending | Germany | Ninja Warrior Germany: Promi Special | (Germany) GPS | Elimination | 8 Specials | RTL | | 24 November 2017 |
| Ended | Germany | Team Ninja Warrior Germany: Promi Special | (Germany) TGPS | Racing Heat | 1 Special | RTL | | 27 July 2019 |
| Unofficial | Serbia | V.I.P. Izazov - Vitez iz Blata (Zvezde Granda); Mud Knight V.I.P. Challenge (Segment on Grand Show) | (Serbia) VVI | Elimination | 1 | RTV Pink | | 1 October 2011 |
| Ended | Switzerland | Ninja Warrior Switzerland: Promi Special | (Switzerland) SWPS | Elimination | 3 Specials | TV24 | | 4 December 2018 |
| Ended | United States | Celebrity Ninja Warrior: Red Nose Day | (United States) CNW | Trial | 2 Specials | NBC | | 25 May 2017 |
Other Formats
| Ended | Japan | BODY | (Japan) BDY | Preliminary Rounds | 59 | TBS | | 3 April 2005 |
| Ended | Japan | ESCAPE | (Japan) ESC | Hybrid | 5 | TBS | | 1 July 2000 |
| Pending | Japan | KASSO (Skateboarding) | (Japan) KSO | Tournament | 4 | TBS | | 18 March 2024 |
| Pending | Japan | KISUKE | (Japan) KSK | Luck | 10 | TBS | | 5 March 2024 |
| Ended | Japan | サスケマニア; Sasuke Maniac | (Japan) SKM | Preliminary Rounds | 108 | TBS | | 2 July 2006 |
| Unofficial | Japan | SARUKE | (Japan) SRK | Heat | 1 | FujiTV | | 25 October 2006 |

=== Format definitions ===
==== Bracket ====
Individuals or teams compete in a Single-elimination tournament or Double-elimination tournament based around brackets to determine advancement through each stage.

==== Dogs ====
A team of one dog and one human compete together, and both must clear the course for a victory. The human may not pick up their dog, but may use their body as a prop such as a bridge or ladder to help the dog along.

==== Elimination ====
Individuals or teams are eliminated at the end of round based on their performance. Performance is typically determined by the number of obstacles cleared, and the time taken to clear them.

==== Heat ====
Individuals or teams compete in a series of heats, with teams being removed incrementally after a set number of heats is completed, or when a set number of heats has been won.

==== International ====
Groups of 4-7 competitors from around the world compete in teams to determine the best country. Typical formats have teams getting eliminated after each stage, based on heats which contain one member of each team.

==== Military only / police only ====
A format unique to Indonesia. Competitors are grouped into three teams based on their police or military unit. Competitors complete the course as normal, with a running total of how many clear for each team. Unlike all other formats, competitors must clear both the qualifier and the semifinals to advance to the finals.

==== Pair ====
A format where two competitors run the course at the same time in two lanes. Each lane has different obstacles, and in some cases one competitor must complete a task to unblock the other lane.

==== Pentathlon ====
A variant of the original format aiming to close the gap between Ninja Warrior, and the obstacle racing debuting in the Modern pentathlon at the 2028 Summer Olympics. Stages include aspects of Fencing and Laser-run not previously seen in any Ninja Warrior series, as well as an increase focus on swimming, which has only appeared in some adaptations of Ninja Warrior.

==== Racing ====
Two competitors race head-to-head over several heats to determine a winner. This format was seen in the semifinals of many international shows, all rounds of Ninja Warrior UK season 6 and Ninja Warrior Poland season 10 onward, as well as the finals of American Ninja Warrior season 17.

==== Senior only ====
A scaled down version of Sasuke for individuals over the age of 55.

==== Strongman ====
This group of shows follows the normal Ninja Warrior format, with obstacles focused on weightlifting skills, similar to Strongman competitions.

==== Trial ====
A single stage course.

==== Women only ====
A modified version of Ninja Warrior that features only female competitors. In Japan, the format followed the original format of the show, whereas other countries make it operate more like qualifying rounds with guaranteed advancement to each stage.

=== Winners around the world ===
Below is a complete list of competitors to achieve Total Victory. Winners are assumed to be of the nationality of their respective show unless otherwise marked. When a season has multiple winners, order is determined by the order shown during broadcast. All results are taken from their respective television broadcasts. Total Victory is achieved only when a competitor completes all stages of the original tournament format of a Ninja Warrior course. Any series with a guaranteed winner is not considered eligible for this title. (Note: Guaranteed winners mean that there is no main tournament rule.)

(#) The number of times that a competitor achieved Total Victory.

==== Total victories during regular seasons ====
As of 2025, there have been a total of 35 Total Victories achieved by 29 individuals.

Of wins to date, the United States and France have had 7, Japan has had 6, Israel has had 4, Vietnam and Australia have had 3, and Germany has had 2.

To date, only three competitors have achieved Total Victory outside their home country: David Campbell, Joel Mattli and Rene Casselly.

Only six individuals have achieved Total Victory twice: Yuuji Urushihara, Yusuke Morimoto, Clement Gravier, Yogev Malka, Vance Walker and Rene Casselly.

Rene Casselly is the only competitor to have achieved Total Victory in two different international versions.

| # | Name | Series | Season | Date |
|---|---|---|---|---|
| 1 | Kazuhiko Akiyama | (Japan) Sasuke | 4 | 16 October 1999 |
| 2 | Makoto Nagano | (Japan) Sasuke | 17 | 11 October 2006 |
| 3 | Yuuji Urushihara | (Japan) Sasuke | 24 | 1 January 2010 |
| 4 | Yuuji Urushihara (2) | (Japan) Sasuke | 27 | 3 October 2011 |
| 5 | Yusuke Morimoto | (Japan) Sasuke | 31 | 1 July 2015 |
| 6 | Geoff Britten | (United States) American Ninja Warrior | 7 | 14 September 2015 |
| 7 | Isaac Caldiero | (United States) American Ninja Warrior | 7 | 14 September 2015 |
| 8 | (United States) David Campbell | (Vietnam) Không giới hạn – Sasuke Việt Nam | 2 | 29 September 2016 |
| 9 | Nguyễn Phước Huynh | (Vietnam) Không giới hạn – Sasuke Việt Nam | 2 | 29 September 2016 |
| 10 | Lê Văn Thực | (Vietnam) Không giới hạn – Sasuke Việt Nam | 2 | 29 September 2016 |
| 11 | Tim Champion | (United Kingdom) Ninja Warrior UK | 5 | 1 June 2019 |
| 12 | Jean Tezenas | (France) Ninja Warrior: Le Parcours des héros | 4 | 2 August 2019 |
| 13 | Nicolas Cerquant | (France) Ninja Warrior: Le Parcours des héros | 4 | 2 August 2019 |
| 14 | Drew Drechsel | (United States) American Ninja Warrior | 11 | 16 September 2019 |
| 15 | Zak Stolz | (Australia) Australian Ninja Warrior | 4 | 10 August 2020 |
| 16 | Charlie Robbins | (Australia) Australian Ninja Warrior | 4 | 10 August 2020 |
| 17 | Ben Polson | (Australia) Australian Ninja Warrior | 4 | 10 August 2020 |
| 18 | Yusuke Morimoto (2) | (Japan) Sasuke | 38 | 29 December 2020 |
| 19 | Moritz Hans | Ninja Warrior Germany | 6 | 18 December 2021 |
| 20 | Rene Casselly | Ninja Warrior Germany | 6 | 18 December 2021 |
| 21 | Iliann Cherif | (France) Ninja Warrior: Le Parcours des héros | 6 | 11 February 2022 |
| 22 | Clement Gravier | (France) Ninja Warrior: Le Parcours des héros | 6 | 11 February 2022 |
| 23 | Yuval Shemla | Ninja Israel | 4 | 5 March 2022 |
| 24 | Yogev Malka | Ninja Israel | 4 | 5 March 2022 |
| 25 | (Switzerland) Joel Mattli | Ninja Warrior Austria | 3 | 28 March 2022 |
| 26 | Shneor Sameach | Ninja Israel | 5 | 3 April 2023 |
| 27 | Yogev Malka (2) | Ninja Israel | 5 | 3 April 2023 |
| 28 | Clement Gravier (2) | (France) Ninja Warrior: Le Parcours des héros | 8 | 11 August 2023 |
| 29 | Matthias Noirel | (France) Ninja Warrior: Le Parcours des héros | 8 | 11 August 2023 |
| 30 | Daniel Gil | (United States) American Ninja Warrior | 15 | 11 September 2023 |
| 31 | Vance Walker | (United States) American Ninja Warrior | 15 | 11 September 2023 |
| 32 | Jan Tatarowicz | (Poland) Ninja Warrior Polska | 9 | 16 April 2024 |
| 33 | Vance Walker (2) | (United States) American Ninja Warrior | 16 | 9 September 2024 |
| 34 | Caleb Bergstrom | (United States) American Ninja Warrior | 16 | 9 September 2024 |
| 35 | (Germany) Rene Casselly (2) | (France) Ninja Warrior: Le Parcours des héros | 9 | 8 August 2025 |

==== Total victory during women's only regular seasons ====
As of 2025, there have been a total of 6 Total Victories achieved by a total of 4 women, all within Japan.

| # | Name | Series | Season | Date |
|---|---|---|---|---|
| 1 | Ayako Miyake | (Japan) Kunoichi | 4 | 25 December 2004 |
| 2 | Ayako Miyake (2) | (Japan) Kunoichi | 5 | 7 January 2006 |
| 3 | Ayako Miyake (3) | (Japan) Kunoichi | 6 | 20 September 2006 |
| 4 | Rie Komiya | (Japan) Kunoichi | 8 | 7 October 2009 |
| 5 | Satomi Kadoi | (Japan) Kunoichi | 8 | 7 October 2009 |
| 6 | Ayano Oshima | (Japan) Kunoichi | 12 | 13 January 2025 |

==== Total victory during kids regular seasons ====
Due to the format of most children's series, only two seasons are eligible for Total Victory: Sasuke Junior and Ninja Israel Kids. To date, there have been 3 Total Victories.

| # | Name | Series | Season | Date |
|---|---|---|---|---|
| 1 | Kazuki Kudo | (Japan) Sasuke Junior | 5 | 2 June 2001 |
| 2 | Naoshi Hasegawa | (Japan) Sasuke Junior | 5 | 9 June 2001 |
| 3 | Geva Levin | Ninja Israel Kids | 1 | 29 January 2020 |

==== Total victory during Super Dog ====
| # | Dog Name | Breed | Human Handler | Series | Season |
|---|---|---|---|---|---|
| 1 | Dizzy Hiroyuki | Border Collie | Inoue Hiroyuki | (Japan) Super Dog | 1 |
| 2 | Lopros Nakamura | Dobermann Pinscher | Kenji Nakamura | (Japan) Super Dog | 1 |
| 3 | Lopros Nakamura | Dobermann Pinscher | Kenji Nakamura | (Japan) Super Dog | 2 |
| 4 | Fine Ichinose | Miniature Dachshund | Nami Ichinose | (Japan) Intelligent Dog | 2 |
| 5 | Milo Ishizaki | Jack Russell Terrier | Yasunori Ishizaki | (Japan) Intelligent Dog | 2 |
| 6 | Shampoo Kosaka | Labrador Retriever | Kenichi Kosaka | (Japan) Intelligent Dog | 2 |
| 7 | Earth Teshigawara | Labrador Retriever | Yoshio Teshigawara | (Japan) Intelligent Dog | 2 |
| 8 | Kenya Fukui | Cavalier King Charles Spaniel | Chie Fukui | (Japan) Intelligent Dog | 2 |

=== Other notable results ===
==== Women's finals buzzers ====
Throughout Ninja Warrior history, it is not relatively common for women to hit buzzers due to the relative advantage men have in mixed-gender sports. There have been over 100 buzzers by women during qualifiers and 40 during semifinals, buzzers on the finals course are still quite rare. Buzzers marked as EX indicate a buzzer on a finals course that occurred during a special outside a main season, which had removed or modified the time limits.

There have been a total of 50 finals buzzers by 18 women. Of these, Olivia Vivian have hit 9, Jessie Graff have hit 8, Steffanie Edelmann and Jesse Labreck have hit 5, Addy Herman have hit 4, Maurane Jelic have hit 3, and Isabella Folsom, Beth Lodge and Viktoria Kramer have hit 2.

† This run would have cleared in the corresponding regular season this special aired in

| # | Name | Buzzer | Series | Season | Year |
|---|---|---|---|---|---|
| 1 | Chie Tanabe (Nishimura) | 1st Stage | (Japan) Sasuke | 2 | 1998 |
| 2 | Nguyễn Đinh Mỹ Linh | 1st Stage | (Vietnam) Không giới hạn – Sasuke Việt Nam | 1 | 2015 |
| 3 | (United States) Grace Jones (Sims) | 1st Stage | (Vietnam) Không giới hạn – Sasuke Việt Nam | 2 | 2016 |
| 4 | Jessie Graff | 1st Stage | (United States) American Ninja Warrior | 8 | 2016 |
| EX1 | Jessie Graff | 2nd Stage | (United States) American Ninja Warrior: USA vs the World | 4 | 2017 |
| 5 | Allyssa Beird | 1st Stage | (United States) American Ninja Warrior | 9 | 2017 |
| 6 | (United States) Jessie Graff | 1st Stage | (Japan) Sasuke | 34 | 2017 |
| 7 | (United States) Jessie Graff | 2nd Stage | (Japan) Sasuke | 34 | 2017 |
| 8 | (Australia) Olivia Vivian | 2nd Stage | (Vietnam) Không giới hạn – Sasuke Việt Nam | 4 | 2018 |
| EX2 | Barclay Stockett | 1st Stage | (United States) American Ninja Warrior: USA vs the World | 6 | 2019 |
| EX3 | Jesse Labreck | 2nd Stage | (United States) American Ninja Warrior: USA vs the World | 6 | 2019 |
| 9 | (United Kingdom) Beth Lodge | 1st Stage | (Vietnam) Không giới hạn – Sasuke Việt Nam | 5 | 2019 |
| 10 | (Australia) Olivia Vivian | 1st Stage | (Vietnam) Không giới hạn – Sasuke Việt Nam | 5 | 2019 |
| 11 | (Australia) Olivia Vivian | 2nd Stage | (Vietnam) Không giới hạn – Sasuke Việt Nam | 5 | 2019 |
| EX4 | (United States) Jessie Graff | 1st Stage | Ninja Warrior Germany: 4 Nations Special | 2 | 2019 |
| 12 | (United States) Jessie Graff | 1st Stage | (Japan) Sasuke | 37 | 2019 |
| 13 | (United States) Jessie Graff | 2nd Stage | (Japan) Sasuke | 37 | 2019 |
| EX5 | (Australia) Olivia Vivian | 1st Stage | (United States) American Ninja Warrior: USA vs the World | 7 | 2020 |
| EX6 | Jesse Labreck | 1st Stage | (United States) American Ninja Warrior: USA vs the World | 7 | 2020 |
| 14 | Olivia Vivian | 1st Stage | (Australia) Australian Ninja Warrior | 4 | 2020 |
| 15 | Steffanie Noppinger (Edelmann) | 1st Stage | Ninja Warrior Austria | 2 | 2020 |
| 16 | Jesse Labreck | 1st Stage | (United States) American Ninja Warrior | 12 | 2020 |
| 17 | Olivia Vivian | 1st Stage | (Australia) Australian Ninja Warrior | 5 | 2021 |
| 18 | Jesse Labreck | 1st Stage | (United States) American Ninja Warrior | 13 | 2021 |
| 19 | (Austria) Steffanie Noppinger (Edelmann) | 1st Stage | Ninja Warrior Germany | 6 | 2021 |
| 20 | (Austria) Steffanie Noppinger (Edelmann) | 2nd Stage | Ninja Warrior Germany | 6 | 2021 |
| 21 | Steffanie Noppinger (Edelmann) | 1st Stage | Ninja Warrior Austria | 3 | 2022 |
| 22 | Ayano Oshima | 1st Stage | (Japan) Sasuke | 40 | 2022 |
| 23 | (Austria) Steffanie Noppinger (Edelmann) | 1st Stage | (Japan) Sasuke | 40 | 2022 |
| 24 | (United States) Jessie Graff | 1st Stage | (Japan) Sasuke | 40 | 2022 |
| 25 | Maurane Jelic | 2nd Stage | (France) Ninja Warrior: Le Parcours des héros | 7 | 2023 |
| EX7 | Addy Herman | 1st Stage | (United States) American Ninja Warrior: Women's Championship | 3 | 2023 |
| EX8 | Isabella Wakeham (Folsom) | 1st Stage | (United States) American Ninja Warrior: Women's Championship | 3 | 2023 |
| EX9 | Jesse Labreck | 1st Stage | (United States) American Ninja Warrior: Women's Championship | 3 | 2023 |
| EX10 | Katie Bone | 2nd Stage | (United States) American Ninja Warrior: Women's Championship | 3 | 2023 |
| EX11 | Addy Herman | 1st Stage | (United States) American Ninja Warrior: Women's Championship | 4 | 2024 |
| EX12 | Isabella Wakeham (Folsom) | 1st Stage | (United States) American Ninja Warrior: Women's Championship | 4 | 2024 |
| EX13 | Taylor Greene | 1st Stage | (United States) American Ninja Warrior: Women's Championship | 4 | 2024 |
| EX14 | Addy Herman | 2nd Stage | (United States) American Ninja Warrior: Women's Championship | 4 | 2024 |
| EX15 | (United States) Jessie Graff | 1st Stage† | (Japan) Sasuke World Cup | 1 | 2024 |
| EX16 | (Australia) Olivia Vivian | 1st Stage† | (Japan) Sasuke World Cup | 1 | 2024 |
| 26 | Nicola Wulf | 1st Stage | Ninja Warrior Germany | 9 | 2024 |
| 27 | (Australia) Olivia Vivian | 1st Stage | (Japan) Sasuke | 42 | 2024 |
| 28 | Maurane Jelic | 1st Stage | (France) Ninja Warrior: Le Parcours des héros | 9 | 2025 |
| 29 | (Germany) Viktoria Kramer | 1st Stage | (France) Ninja Warrior: Le Parcours des héros | 9 | 2025 |
| 30 | (United Kingdom) Beth Lodge | 2nd Stage | (France) Ninja Warrior: Le Parcours des héros | 9 | 2025 |
| 31 | (Germany) Viktoria Kramer | 2nd Stage | (France) Ninja Warrior: Le Parcours des héros | 9 | 2025 |
| 32 | Maurane Jelic | 2nd Stage | (France) Ninja Warrior: Le Parcours des héros | 9 | 2025 |
| EX17 | (United States) Addy Herman | 1st Stage† | (Japan) Sasuke World Cup | 2 | 2026 |
| EX18 | (Australia) Olivia Vivian | 1st Stage† | (Japan) Sasuke World Cup | 2 | 2026 |

== See also ==
- Kinniku Banzuke (known in the United States as Unbeatable Banzuke)
- Kunoichi (women's version of Sasuke)
- Viking: The Ultimate Obstacle Course
- Sarutobi Sasuke
- Australian Ninja Warrior
- Ninja Warrior Germany
- Ninja Warrior UK
- American Ninja Warrior
- Sasuke Ninja Warrior Indonesia
- Sasuke Vietnam
