= Ninja Warrior (disambiguation) =

Ninja Warrior is a sports entertainment reality television franchise that began airing in 1997.

Ninja Warrior may also refer to:

== Film ==
- Lone Ninja Warrior (1983 film), a Taiwanese wuxia film

== Television ==
- Sasuke (TV series) (also shown as Sasuke Ninja Warrior), a Japanese television show based around an obstacle course
  - Kunoichi (TV series) (Women of Ninja Warrior), a TV show spun-off from Sasuke, featuring exclusively female competitors
  - Sasuke Ninja Warrior Indonesia, an Indonesian adaptation of the Sasuke format
  - Sasuke Vietnam, a Vietnamese adaptation of the Sasuke format
  - American Ninja Warrior, an American variation of Sasuke that began as a qualifier to compete on Sasuke
    - Team Ninja Warrior, a spin-off of American Ninja Warrior focused on team competition
  - Ninja Warrior UK, a British adaptation of the Ninja Warrior format
  - Australian Ninja Warrior, an Australian adaptation of the Ninja Warrior format
  - Ninja Warrior Germany, a German adaptation of the Ninja Warrior format

== Video games ==
- The Ninja Warriors (1987 video game), a beat 'em up game for arcades
- The Ninja Warriors (1994 video game), a beat 'em up game for the Super NES which is both a sequel and remake

== Other uses ==
- Ninja, shinobi and kunoichi, martial artist warriors

== See also ==
- Ninja (disambiguation)
- Warrior (disambiguation)
- Shinobi (disambiguation)
- Kunoichi (disambiguation)
