= Ninja (disambiguation) =

A ninja was a secret agent or mercenary of feudal Japan specializing in unorthodox arts of war.

Ninja may also refer to:

== People ==
- Ninja (British rapper), a member of the band The Go! Team named Nkechi Ka Egenamba
- Ninja (gamer), the alias of American professional gamer Richard Tyler Blevins
- Ninja (singer), Indian singer and actor
- Ninja, the alias of Watkin Tudor Jones, a South African rapper and member of hip hop group Die Antwoord
- Ninja Sarasalo, Finnish model and singer
- Bert Batawang, a boxer with the ring name The Ninja
- Murilo Rua, ring name Ninja, an MMA fighter
- Rodrigo Ninja, Brazilian footballer

== Arts, entertainment, and media ==
- Ninja (comic book), a 1983–98 Yugoslav novel/comic series
- Ninja (film), a 2009 film by Isaac Florentine
- The Ninja (novel), a 1980 novel by Eric Van Lustbader

=== Music ===
- Ninja (album), an album by Christina Aguilar
- Ninja (group), a Japanese boy-band active 1990–1997

==== Songs ====
- "Ninja" (Soprano song), 2020
- "Ninja" (Young Thug song), 2025
- "Ninja", a song by Europe from the 1986 album The Final Countdown
- "Ninja", a song by Jay Chou from the 2001 album Fantasy
- "Ninjas", a 2017 song by Rey Pila

=== Television ===
- A number of television shows based on a Ninja Warrior concept:
  - Sasuke (TV series) (also shown as Ninja Warrior), a Japanese television show based around an obstacle course
  - Kunoichi (TV series) (Women of Ninja Warrior), a TV show spun-off from Sasuke, featuring exclusively female competitors
  - Sasuke Ninja Warrior Indonesia, an Indonesian adaptation of Sasuke's format
  - American Ninja Warrior, an American variation of Sasuke that began as a qualifier to compete on Sasuke
  - Team Ninja Warrior, a spin-off of American Ninja Warrior focused on team competition
  - Ninja Warrior UK, a British adaptation of the Ninja Warrior format
  - Australian Ninja Warrior, an Australian adaptation of the Ninja Warrior format
  - Ninja Warrior Germany, a German adaptation of the Ninja Warrior format

=== Video games ===
- Ninja (1986 video game) (arcade title: Ninja Mission), a flip screen beat 'em up game developed by Sculptured Software and released by Mastertronic
- Ninja: Shadow of Darkness, a 1998 video game for the PlayStation
- Sega Ninja, a video game also known as The Ninja or Ninja Princess

== Computing ==
- Ninja (build system), a small build system with a focus on speed by Google
- .ninja, a generic top-level domain

== Groups, teams, organizations ==
- Ninja (militia), a militia in the Republic of the Congo
- Ninjas in Pyjamas, Swedish professional video game esports team

== Roller coasters ==
- Ninja (Six Flags Magic Mountain), an inverted roller coaster at Six Flags Magic Mountain
- Ninja (Six Flags St. Louis), a roller coaster at Six Flags St. Louis
- Blue Hawk (roller coaster), formerly known as Ninja, a roller coaster at Six Flags Over Georgia

== Other uses ==
- Kawasaki Ninja, several series of Japanese sport bikes
- SharkNinja, makers of Ninja brand kitchen appliances
- NINJA loan, for "no income no job or asset", a term related to the US subprime mortgage crisis (see no income, no asset)
- Ninja miner, a Mongolian small-scale gold miner

== See also ==
- List of ninja films
- Modern schools of ninjutsu
- Nina (name)
- Ninja in popular culture
- Kunoichi (disambiguation)
- Ninja Warrior (disambiguation)
- Shinobi (disambiguation)
