= American Ninja Challenge =

- Genre: Documentary
- Country of origin: United States
- Original language: English
- No. of seasons: 4
- No. of episodes: 8

Production
- Executive producers: Arthur Smith; Kent Weed; Holly M. Wofford; Vittoria Cacciatore
- Camera setup: Multi-camera
- Running time: 60 minutes
- Production companies: Mark Phillips Philms & Telephision

Original release
- Network: G4
- Release: November 11, 2007 – June 21, 2009

Related
- American Ninja Warrior

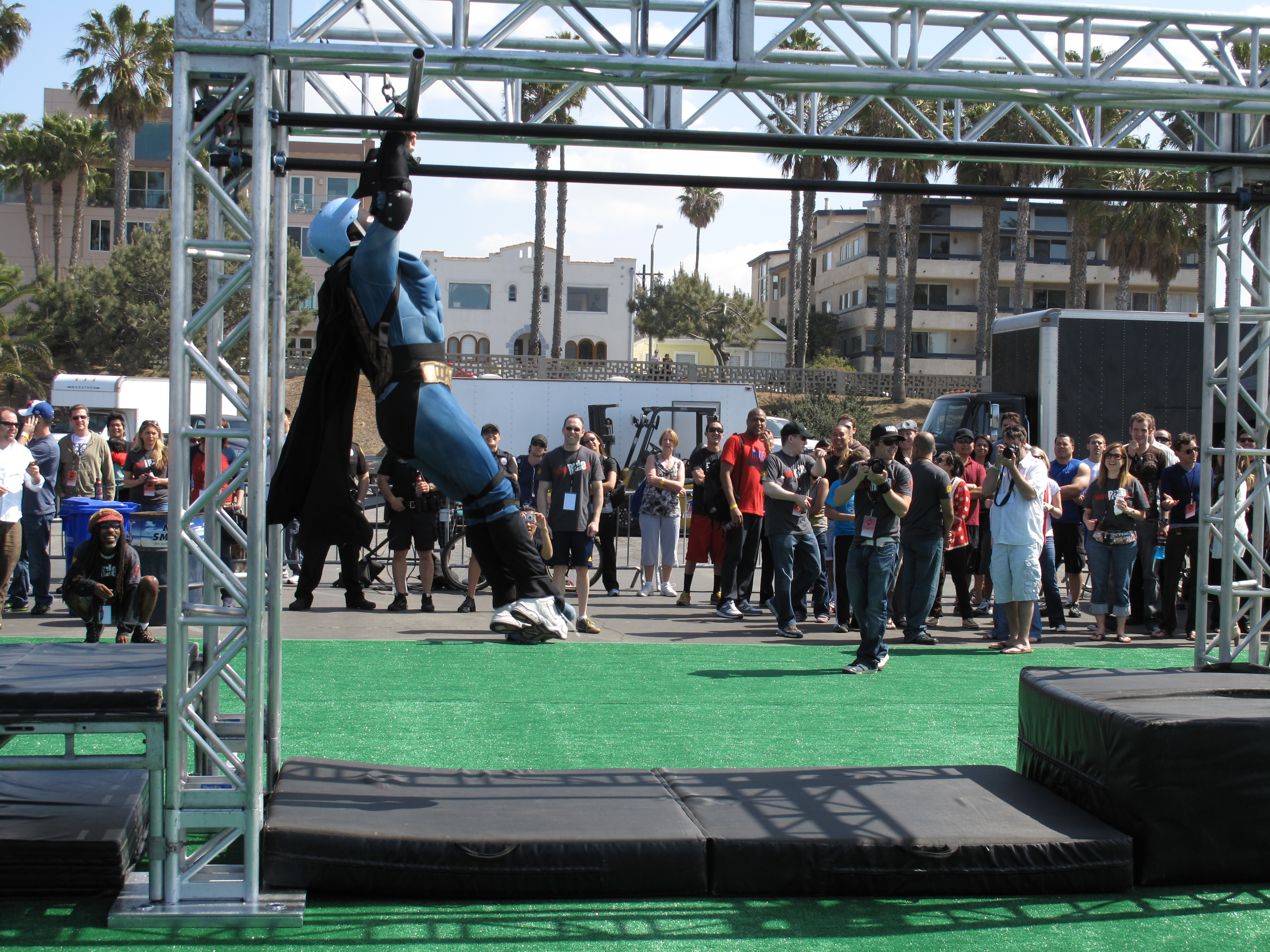
American Ninja Challenge competitor in Batman costume.

The American Ninja Challenge was a nationwide competition sponsored by G4 TV to send a number of American citizens to Japan to compete in the TBS hit TV show Sasuke (known as Ninja Warrior in the US). The American Ninja Challenge has been held since Sasuke 19 (the 19th competition) and currently merged into the TV series American Ninja Warrior that premiered on December 12, 2009 and succeeded the American Ninja Challenge.

== Episodes ==
=== Ninja Fest (2006) ===
G4's Attack of the Show hosts Kevin Pereira and Olivia Munn broadcast a competition to ninja aspirees everywhere to create a video displaying their 'ninja moves'. Hundreds of people sent in submissions, and three finalists were selected. Through various competitions in America, the two winners were chosen; Colin Bell from Michigan and Brett Sims from South Carolina went to Japan. They then participated in the Ninja Warrior Sasuke tournament.

=== Ninja Fest 2 (2007) ===
Once the videos were sent in, six finalists were chosen. The six finalists were: Russelis Perry aka "Blackie Chan") from Colorado Springs, Colorado; martial artist Joe Simonsen from West Islip, New York; Freerunner Brian Orosco from San Francisco, California; Rick Seedman from New York City, New York; freerunner Levi Meeuwenburg from Ann Arbor, Michigan; and Mark Witmer from Minneapolis, Minnesota.

These six finalists then went to a US Navy training camp, where they competed on a marine training obstacle course. In '1v1' challenges, three of the six competitors were eliminated. Once there were three challengers left, they competed on an improvised course consisting of several of the new Ninja Warrior's most difficult obstacles.

The winner, Levi Meeuwenberg, cleared it in 45 seconds, followed by Brian Orosco at 1:12 and Russelis Perry in third place at 1:16. In Japan the two top finalists Levi and Brian were joined by former finalist Brett Sims to take on the course at Midoriyama.

==== Trip to Japan ====
Levi and Brian, prior to leaving for Japan, met with U.S. Olympic athlete and Ninja Warrior competitor Paul Terek, who has reached the third stage in past Ninja Warrior competitions. Paul trained them in strategies and tactics to quickly and successfully defeat some of the trickier obstacles of Ninja Warrior. Afterward, they headed to Japan, where they enjoyed Japanese culture and met for a dinner with Ninja Warrior's all-stars, including Makoto Nagano, the winner of the 17th Ninja Warrior tournament. Some other all-stars they met were: Shingo Yamamoto, gas station manager, and firefighter Toshihiro Takeda, who has reached the third stage more than any other competitors.

=== Ninja Fest 3 (2008) ===
The third American Ninja Challenge contest by G4 wrapped up in August 2008, and aired as part of November 12, 2008. Viewers got to vote for their favorite competitors and the top three would be picked and flown directly to Japan to compete in Sasuke 21. The three winners were Brian Orosco (who qualified with a different video), gymnast Mark Witmer of Minneapolis, Minnesota, and freerunner/stuntwoman Luci Romberg (the first woman to qualify) of Valley Village, California. These winners joined American Ninja Challenge 2 winner Levi Meeuwenberg and both hosts from Attack of the Show!, Olivia Munn and Kevin Pereira competed. In Japan, they have the ultimate experience, along with training at Muscle Park, a scaled-down version of the Sasuke course located in a section of the shopping mall called "Muscule Park".

=== Ninja Fest 4 (2009) ===
The fourth and final Ninja Challenge contest winner was David Campbell. He joined up with former Ninja Challenge winners Luci Romberg and Levi Meeuwenberg to compete in Sasuke 22. Also joining them was the returning host Olivia Munn for the run to the top of mount Midoriyama. This season concluded the American Ninja Challenge, which subsequently evolved into its own national format – American Ninja Warrior. Beginning with the 4th season of American Ninja Warrior, the qualifiers would compete on a replicated Sasuke Midoriyama course in Las Vegas, US (and no longer participate in the Japanese version of the show). Beginning with ANW5, additional "Special" competitions would also be arranged between the finalists of the Japanese and US editions of the show.

== Notable contestant results at Sasuke (Ninja Warrior) ==
Levi Meeuwenberg	Competition	Order #	Obstacle	Stage
American Ninja Challenge 2-Winner	20th	1989	Failed Shin-Cliffhanger	Third
Invitation based on bids	21st	99	Failed Salmon Ladder	Second
Invitation based on bids	22nd	91	Failed Slider Jump	First

Brian Orosco	Competition	Order #	Obstacle	Stage
American Ninja Challenge 2 – Runner-Up	20th	1945	Failed Flying Chute	First
American Ninja Challenge 3 – Winner	21st	75	Failed Salmon Ladder	Second

Luci Romberg	Competition	Order #	Obstacle	Stage
American Ninja Challenge 3 – Winner	21st	35	Failed Half Pipe Attack	First
Invitation to Return	22nd	63	Failed Jumping Spider	First

David Campbell	Competition	Order #	Obstacle	Stage
American Ninja Challenge 4 – Winner	22nd	50	Failed Final Climb (Time Out)	First

== Hosts and announcers for G4 ==
Kevin Pereira	Competition	#	Obstacle	Stage
Attack of the Show Host	21st	40	Failed Log Grip	First

Olivia Munn	Competition	#	Obstacle	Stage
Attack of the Show Hostess	21st	27	Failed Quintuple Steps	First
Attack of the Show Hostess	22nd	40	Failed Circle Hammer	First

== American Ninja Warrior ==
The popularity of the American Ninja Challenge led G4 to create a licensed version of Sasuke titled American Ninja Warrior, with contestants from the United States and all play-by-play commentary in English.

== See also ==
- American Ninja Warrior (US)
- Team Ninja Warrior (US)
- Sasuke – Japan
- Kunoichi (Women's version of Sasuke) – Japan
- Kinniku Banzuke (known in the U.S. as Unbeatable Banzuke) – Japan
- Viking: The Ultimate Obstacle Course – Japan
- Australian Ninja Warrior – Australia
- Ninja Warrior UK – UK
- Ninja Warrior Germany – Germany
- Sasuke Ninja Warrior Indonesia – Indonesia
- Sasuke Vietnam – Vietnam
- Wipeout (2008 game show) – US
- Wipeout (2021 game show) – US
- Ultimate Beastmaster – US
- Takeshi's Castle – Japan
- Sports Danshi Grand Prix – Japan
- KASSO – Japan
- Pilgrim Films & Television
