= Sasuke =

Sasuke may refer to:

In history and geography:

- Sasuke Inari Shrine, a Shinto Shrine in Kamakura, Japan

In general usage:

- Sarutobi Sasuke, a ninja in Japanese folklore
- Sasuke (manga), a Japanese manga series by Sanpei Shirato and the 1968 anime television series
- Sasuke (TV series), a televised sports entertainment special in Japan
  - Sasuke Ninja Warrior Indonesia, an Indonesian adaptation of the Sasuke format
  - Sasuke Vietnam, a Vietnamese adaptation of the Sasuke format
- The Great Sasuke or Masanori Murakawa (born 1969), Japanese professional wrestler

Music

- "Sasuke" (song), a song by rapper Lil Uzi Vert

Fictional characters:

- Sasuke Uchiha (うちは サスケ), a main character in the manga and anime series Naruto
- Sasuke, a character in The Legend of the Mystical Ninja series media
- Sasuke, a character in Ninja Nonsense media
- Sasuke, the main character of the video game Ninja Master's
- Sasuke or NinjaRed, one of several main characters in the Ninja Sentai Kakuranger television series
- Sasuke or Sazo, a character in Mirmo! media
- Sasuké, a character in the Usagi Yojimbo comic book series
- Sasuke Matsutani, a character in the Legendz universe
- Sasuke Sagami, a character in the manga Animal Academy: Hakobune Hakusho
- Sasuke Sarugakure, a character in the Ranma ½ anime

== See also ==
- Ryūnosuke
- Sansuke
- Sōsuke, a masculine Japanese given name
