= Midoriyama =

Midoriyama may refer to:

- Mount Midoriyama, production sites for acrobatic competitions:
  - in Japan; for Sasuke (TV series)
  - in Las Vegas, NV, USA; for American Ninja Warrior
  - in Germany; for Ninja Warrior Germany
  - in the UK; for Ninja Warrior UK
  - in Australia; for Australian Ninja Warrior
  - in Haifa, Israel; for Ninja Israel
  - in Poland; for Ninja Warrior Polska
  - In Binh Dương, Vietnam; for SASUKE Vietnam
- Midoriyama Middle School in anime The Prince of Tennis
