= Sōsuke =

- Gender: Male

Origin
- Origin: Japanese
- Meaning: Different meanings depending on the kanji used

Sōsuke, Sosuke or Sousuke (written: 宗佑, 宗輔, 宗助, 壮祐, 壮介, 壮亮, 荘介, 蒼甫, 創介, そうすけ, or ソウスケ) is a masculine Japanese given name. Notable people with the name include:

- Sōsuke Genda (源田 壮亮; born 1993), Japanese professional baseball player
- Sōsuke Henmi (逸見 宗助; 1843–1894), Japanese swordsman
- Sosuke Ikematsu (池松 壮亮; born 1990), Japanese actor
- Sōsuke Kaise (海瀬 壮祐), Japanese manga artist
- Sōsuke Namiki (並木 宗輔; 1695 – ca. 1751), Japanese playwright
- Sosuke Shibata (柴田 壮介; born 2001), Japanese footballer
- Sosuke Sumitani (炭谷 宗佑; born 1980), Japanese announcer
- Sousuke Takaoka (高岡 蒼甫; born 1982), Japanese former actor
- Sosuke Toda (戸田 壮介; born 1941), Japanese fencer
- Sōsuke Uno (宇野 宗佑; 1922–1998), Japanese politician and Prime Minister of Japan

== Fictional characters ==
- Sousuke Aizen (藍染 惣右介), a character in the manga series Bleach
- Sōsuke Esumi (江角 走輔), protagonist of the tokusatsu series Engine Sentai Go-onger
- Sōsuke Mitsuba (三葉 惣助), a character in the manga series Toilet-Bound Hanako-kun
- Sōsuke Sagara (相良 宗介), protagonist of the light novel series Full Metal Panic!
- Sōsuke Yamazaki (山崎 宗介), a character in the anime series Free! Eternal Summer
- Sōsuke (宗介), one of the protagonists of the anime film Ponyo
- Sōsuke Sugaya (菅谷 創介), a character from the Assassination Classroom manga and anime series

== See also ==
- Sasuke (disambiguation)
