= Shinobi (disambiguation) =

Shinobi (忍び) is a Japanese synonym for ninja. Female shinobi may also be referred to as kunoichi. Shinobi may also refer to:

- Shinobi (series), a series of video games
  - Shinobi (1987 video game), the original arcade video game in the series developed by Sega
  - The G.G. Shinobi, the 1991 Game Gear game that is also known as simply Shinobi
  - Shinobi (2002 video game), the PlayStation 2 sequel
  - Shinobi (2011 video game), the 2011 Nintendo 3DS game
- Shinobi: Heart Under Blade, a 2005 Japanese film
- "Shinobi", a song by Eyehategod from the album In the Name of Suffering
- Shinobi Shaw, a Marvel Comics villain
- Ring name of professional wrestler Al Snow (born 1963)

== See also ==
- Kunoichi (disambiguation)
- Ninja (disambiguation)
- Ninja Warrior (disambiguation)
