= Kunoichi (disambiguation) =

A kunoichi is a female ninja.

Kunoichi may also refer to:

== Media ==
- Kunoichi (TV series), a Japanese sports entertainment show known as Women of Ninja Warrior in English
- Kunoichi (video game), a Japanese video game also known as Nightshade in English
- The Kunoichi: Ninja Girl, a Japanese film also known as The Kunoichi: Ninja Girl in English
- "Kunoichi", a song by GO!GO!7188 from the album Ryūzetsuran
- "Kunoichi", a song by Afrirampo from the album A'

== Fictional characters ==
- Kunoichi, a playable character in the Samurai Warriors video game series, also appearing in the Warriors Orochi crossover series
- Kunoichi, a player character in the video games The Ninja Warriors and The Ninja Warriors Again
- Kunoichi, a playable character in the video game Mini Ninjas
- Kunoichi, a character in the anime series Yoshimune

== Other uses ==
- Iga FC Kunoichi, a Japanese women's football club

== See also ==
- Ninja (disambiguation)
- Ninja Warrior (disambiguation)
- Shinobi (disambiguation)
