= Lai Van Sam =

Vietnamese journalist

Lại Văn Sâm
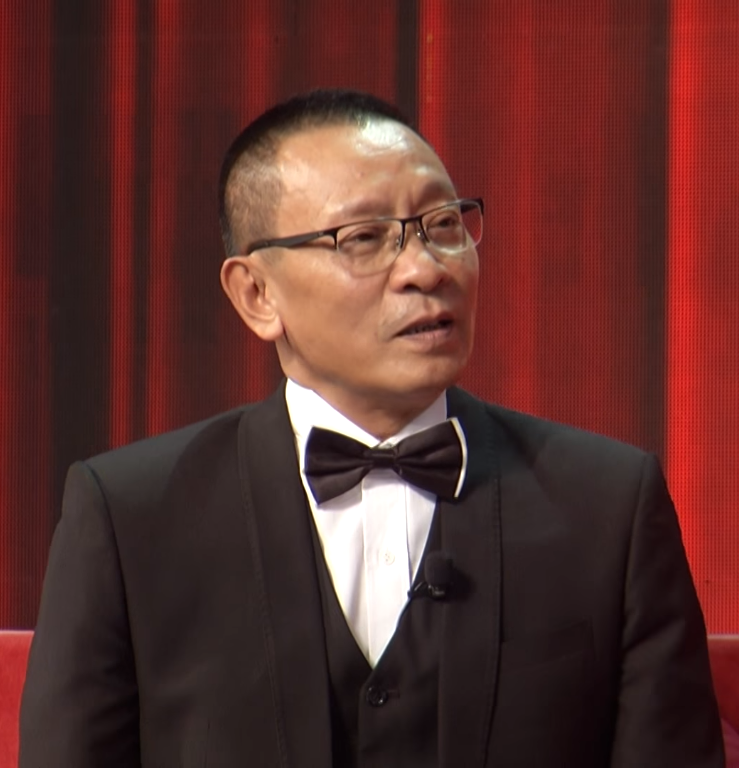
- Lại Văn Sâm on a show in late 2017
- Born: June 10, 1957 (age 69); Phu Tho, Phu Tho Province, North Vietnam
- Education: Studied Hinduism in the Soviet Union
- Occupations: Journalist; master of ceremonies
- Years active: 1987–2021; 2022–present
- Known for: Host of Ai Là Triệu Phú (2005 - 2017)
- Notable credit(s): Hosting TV programs, founding VTV3
- Children: Lại Bắc Hải Đăng

Lại Văn Sâm (born June 10, 1957) is a Vietnamese journalist and MC.

== Biography ==
Lại Văn Sâm studied Hinduism for 12 years in Tashkent.

He was host of many television programs, such as Ai là triệu phú? (Who Wants to Be a Millionaire?), Trò chơi liên tỉnh (Intervilles), SV (KVN), Đấu Trí (PokerFace), Chiếc nón kỳ diệu (Wheel of Fortune), Hãy chọn giá đúng (The Price Is Right), Không giới hạn - Sasuke Việt Nam (Sasuke / Ninja Warrior) and Ký ức vui vẻ (De generatieshow). He was also one of the founders of VTV3.

On October 5, 2008, he received an award for being the most popular game show host of VTV.
