= Jesse Labreck =

American Ninja Warrior competitor

Jesse "Flex" Labreck
- Labreck in 2021
- Education: University of Maine
- Occupations: Gym manager, American Ninja Warrior competitor
- Years active: 2016–present
- Television: American Ninja Warrior, American Ninja Warrior: Ninja vs Ninja, Team Ninja Warrior, American Ninja Warrior: All Stars, Ninja Warrior Germany
- Height: 5 ft 7.5 in (171.5 cm)
- Partner: Chris DiGangi
- Website: www.flexlabreck.com

Jesse "Flex" Labreck is an American gym manager, athlete, and American Ninja Warrior (ANW) competitor. A former collegiate track and field athlete for the University of Maine, Labreck debuted on ANW in 2016. She won season 3 of American Ninja Warrior: Ninja vs Ninja in 2018 and won the ANW women's championship in 2022. Labreck was inducted into the University of Maine Sports Hall of Fame in 2018. After running a ninja gym in Naperville, Illinois for 7 years, she moved back to Maine, where she now resides with her fiancé, fellow ninja competitor Chris DiGangi, and their two children.

== Early life ==
Labreck is from Oakland, Maine. In fifth grade, at the encouragement of a science teacher, she tried out for track and field. She attended Messalonskee High School, where she continued to participate in track and field. Labreck went to the University of Maine where she got a degree in elementary education.

== Collegiate sports ==
Labreck was a track star at the University of Maine, earning a full athletic scholarship. She competed in hurdles and the heptathlon and, as of 2025, still holds 9 collegiate records. She was named most outstanding field performer twice in the America East indoor championship and won the Coaches Award for most points scored at the outdoor meet another two times.

Labreck was inducted into the University of Maine Sports Hall of Fame in 2018.

== Career ==
While preparing for ANW, Labreck got a job coaching track and field at Wheaton College in Norton, Massachusetts, with her former University of Maine coach Dave Cusano. After Cusano transferred to another university, Labreck began a part-time job at a gym in Massachusetts. Later, she became a live-in caretaker to a woman with cerebral palsy. Labreck first became aware of ninja warrior competitions while working as a fourth-grade teacher in Belgrade, Maine.

Labreck operated and coached at her gym, Ultimate Ninjas, in Naperville, Illinois for seven years. In 2025, she moved back to her home state of Maine and was hired as the manager and head coach of the Alfond Youth & Community Center in Waterville.

In April 2024, with fellow ANW competitor Mike Silenzi, Labreck released a children's book about ninja titled Hit the Buzzer: I Can Be an Ultimate Ninja.

== On American Ninja Warrior ==
Labreck made her debut to ANW in season 8 at the age of 25, making it to the national finals. She was the first woman to make it to the national finals in her rookie year. In ANW season 9, Labreck and Allyssa Beird both hit buzzers at the city qualifiers in Cleveland, Ohio. This marked the first time that two women had ever hit qualifying buzzers in the same region. Later that season, Labreck became the second woman (after Jessie Graff) to make the top 15 in a city finals course. In 2018, Labreck won season 3 of American Ninja Warrior: Ninja vs. Ninja (formerly Team Ninja Warrior) with her team Labreckfast Club as the only female team leader among 32 teams. In 2022, she won the second annual ANW women's championship.

Labreck has made it to the national finals 7 times in total. She also held the women's buzzer record of 10 buzzers until she was surpassed by Taylor Greene in 2026. As of 2021, she also held the record for most buzzers by a woman in a single season, with 6. She is only one of 3 women to have completed Stage 1 of the ANW national finals in Las Vegas, alongside Jessie Graff and Allyssa Beird.
