= Ryūnosuke =

- Gender: Male

Origin
- Origin: Japanese
- Meaning: Different meanings depending on the kanji used Possible meaning: Son [of] Dragon

Other names
- Related names: Sasuke

Ryūnosuke, Ryunosuke or Ryuunosuke (written: 龍之介, 隆之介, 竜之介 or 龍之助) is a masculine Japanese given name. Notable people with the name by the character combination will be grouped as:

(龍之介)

- Ryūnosuke Akutagawa (芥川 龍之介; 1892–1927), Japanese writer
- Ryūnosuke Endō (遠藤 龍之介; born 1956), Japanese businessperson
- Ryunosuke Kingetsu (金月 龍之介; born 1971), Japanese screenwriter
- Ryūnosuke Kusaka (草鹿 龍之介; 1893–1971), Imperial Japanese Navy admiral
- Ryunosuke Kimura (木村 龍之介; born 1983), Japanese theatre director
- Ryunosuke Mochida (持田 龍之介; born 1993), Japanese weightlifter
- Ryūnosuke Tsukigata (月形 龍之介; 1902–1970), Japanese actor
- Ryūnosuke Tsukue (机 龍之介; born 1997), Japanese squash player

(隆之介)

- Ryunosuke Kamiki (神木 隆之介; born 1993), Japanese actor and voice actor
- Ryunosuke Noda (野田 隆之介; born 1988), Japanese footballer

(竜之介)

- Ryunosuke Okamoto (岡本 竜之介; born 1984), Japanese footballer

(龍之助)

- Ryunosuke Sugawara (菅原 龍之助; born 2000), Japanese footballer

== Fictional characters ==
- Ryūnosuke Akasaka (赤坂 龍之介), character in the anime and light novel series The Pet Girl of Sakurasou
- Ryūnosuke Akutagawa (芥川 龍之介), character in the anime and manga series Bungo Stray Dogs
- Ryūnosuke Chiba (千葉 龍之介), a character from Assassination Classroom
- Ryunosuke Fujinami (藤波 竜之介), character in the manga series Urusei Yatsura
- Ryunosuke Ibuki (井吹 龍之介), character in video game and anime series Hakuouki
- Ryunosūke Naruhōdo, character in the Ace Attorney series
- Ryunosuke Natsume (夏目 龍之介), character in the manga series All Purpose Cultural Cat Girl Nuku Nuku
- Ryūnosuke Tanaka (田中 龍之介), character in the anime and manga series Haikyuu!! with the position of wing spiker from Karasuno High
- Ryūnosuke Umemiya, a character from Shaman King
- Ryūnosuke Uryū (雨生 龍之介), character in the light novel series Fate/Zero
- Ryuunosuke Mogumo (百雲 龍之介), character in the manga series Love Me for Who I Am
- Ryunosuke Miyaji (宮地 龍之介), character in the anime and manga series Starry Sky

== See also ==
- Sasuke, a masculine Japanese given name
