= Rodrigo Ninja =

Brazilian footballer (born 1981)

Personal information
- Full name: Carlos Rodrigo da Silva
- Date of birth: 21 November 1981 (age 44)
- Place of birth: Campinas, Brazil
- Height: 1.71 m (5 ft 7 in)
- Position: Left-back

Youth career
- Ponte Preta

Senior career*
| Years | Team | Apps | (Gls) |
| 2002 | Minaçu-GO | | |
| 2002 | Nacional-AM | | |
| 2003–2004 | Gama | | |
| 2004 | Novo Horizonte-GO | | |
| 2005 | Cianorte | | |
| 2005 | Vila Aurora | | |
| 2005 | CENE | | |
| 2006 | Joinville | | |
| 2006–2007 | Gama | | |
| 2007 | Çaykur Rizespor | | |
| 2008 | São Caetano | | |
| 2008 | Gama | | |
| 2009 | Ponte Preta | | |
| 2009 | América de Natal | | |
| 2009 | Bragantino | | |
| 2010 | Mixto | | |
| 2010 | Rio Branco-SP | | |
| 2011 | Veranópolis | | |
| 2011 | Ituiutaba | | |
| 2011–2012 | Metropolitano | | |
| 2012–2013 | Rio Claro | | |
| 2013 | Botafogo-PB | | |
| 2013 | Santo André | | |
| 2014 | Monte Azul | | |
| 2015 | Rio Claro | | |
- * Club domestic league appearances and goals

Carlos Rodrigo da Silva (born 21 November 1981), better known as Rodrigo Ninja, is a Brazilian former professional footballer who played as a left-back.

== Career ==
Rodrigo Ninja gained national recognition in 2007, when he scored SE Gama's qualifying goal against CR Vasco da Gama in the 2007 Copa do Brasil, in a match where Romário was expected to score his thousandth goal. After this feat, he ended up being hired by Çaykur Rizespor.

After an unsuccessful stay in Turkey, he suffered depression, became involved in marital problems with his wife and began to face problems with alcohol and drug use, frequently having shortened spells at clubs due to missing training or not being able to perform properly. He ended his career definitively in 2015, after testing positive for cocaine in an anti-doping test.

== Post career ==
Rodrigo Ninja was admitted to a halfway house for addicts in Campinas after retiring. Currently plays in the city's amateur football.

== Honours ==
Gama

- Campeonato Brasiliense: 2003

Botafogo-PB

- Campeonato Brasileiro Série D: 2013
