= Sasuke Vietnam =

- Vietnamese: Không giới hạn - Sasuke Việt Nam
- Genre: Sports entertainment Sports game show Reality
- Created by: Masato Inui
- Based on: Sasuke by Ushio Higuchi
- Directed by: Lại Bắc Hải Đăng
- Presented by: Lại Văn Sâm; Nguyên Khang; Diệp Lâm Anh; Thành Trung; Phạm Anh Khoa; Thiều Bảo Trâm; Minh Xù; Tuyền Tăng; Hoàng Yến Chibi; Various special hosts in several episodes
- Music by: Hoàng Anh Minh
- Country of origin: Vietnam
- Original language: Vietnamese
- No. of seasons: 5
- No. of episodes: 96

Production
- Executive producer: Lại Văn Sâm
- Production company: Vietnam Television

Original release
- Network: VTV3
- Release: 18 June 2015 – 2 December 2019
- Release: 2026

Related
- Sasuke; Ninja Warrior UK; American Ninja Warrior; Ninja Warrior Germany; Australian Ninja Warrior; Sasuke Ninja Warrior Indonesia

Sasuke Vietnam (Vietnamese: Không giới hạn - Sasuke Việt Nam, lit. 'Sasuke Vietnam: Unlimited') is a Vietnamese game show and sports entertainment competition, based on the Japanese television series Sasuke which is aired on VTV3.

Dubbed as the "most expensive Vietnamese television show" by VTV and "Asia’s first large-scale adaptation" of Sasuke by TBS, the show focuses on around 120 to 260 contestants during each season tackling a difficult assault course featuring a variety of obstacles. Contestants advance in the competition by achieving a fast enough time or progressing far enough along the course. The competition culminates with a final, in which the contestant who goes furthest fastest is declared "Last Man Standing". If a competitor completes the final stage, Mt Midoriyama, in under 30 seconds (35 seconds in the fourth season), they will be declared winner of the competition.

The first season of Sasuke Vietnam was premiered on June 18, 2015, and broadcast on VTV3. As of now, the show has produced and aired five seasons, with three Total Victories by three different competitors, all in the second season.

The sixth season firstly set to be premiered in 2020, later postponed due to COVID-19 pandemic, but was subsequently cancelled when the license elapsed in 2022. It was clear to some the show was on its last legs, but in 2025, TBS announced that they renewed the licensed contact of the show for VTV, and thus Sasuke Vietnam will be rebooted after seven years.

== Format ==
Similar to Sasuke, the competition is split into two main phases: Audition, and the Finals.

=== Audition ===
The auditions are held in various provinces and cities around Vietnam. It has 4 challenges. The maximum score for each challenge is 10 points. The time limit for the first 3 challenge is 1 minute.

- Pull-up (40 times) | Minimum required: 5 pull-ups
- Push-up (60 times) | Minimum required: 7 push-ups
- 60-kg tire flipping (40 times) | Minimum required: 5 times
- 100m running (4 rounds of 25m) in 20.4 seconds | Maximum time limit: 29 seconds

Since the fourth season, international competitors do not need to participate in the qualifiers. Instead, they need to send a video confirmed that they had competed in any Sasuke/Ninja Warrior tournament or participated in any physical competitions.

As a side note, the audition was not broadcast as the season premiere until the fifth season.

=== The Finals ===
The finals are divided into four separate stages of obstacles. They must complete the entire course to advance to the next stage.

Stage One was a split-stage format, in which the course was split to Stage 1A part and Stage 1B part starting from the third obstacle to the final obstacle. The stage did not feature time limit until the third season.

Stage Two had 6 obstacles (5 obstacles on the fourth season) with a strict time limit on the first, second and fifth seasons.

Stage Three had 6 obstacles (7 obstacles on the fifth season) without time limit. But after clearing an obstacle, competitors had a time limit to rest before attempting the next obstacle.

The Final Stage is a 24-meter giant (fictional) "Mount Midoriyama" tower with Spider Climb and Rope Climb, which must be completed in under 30 seconds (35 seconds in the fourth season). Should a competitor complete this, they will then have achieved total victory. In the event that no competitor completes the final course, the competitor who goes furthest along the course in the fastest time is declared "Last Man Standing".

== Seasons overview ==
Seasons	Start date	End date	Episodes	Taping place	Winner's prize	Winner	Results
1	June 18, 2015	October 29, 2015	18	Becamex Tokyu Garden City, Bình Dương, Ho Chi Minh City	Honda CR-V	Lê Văn Thực	Failed Stage 3
2	May 19, 2016	September 29, 2016	18	Becamex Tokyu Garden City, Bình Dương, Ho Chi Minh City	800.000.000₫	Lê Văn Thực	Achieved Total Victory (Note: David Campbell and Nguyễn Phước Huynh achieved Total Victory, while Thực won the 800.000.000₫ grand prize.)
3	June 22, 2017	October 5, 2017	14	Becamex Tokyu Garden City, Bình Dương, Ho Chi Minh City	800.000.000₫	Mat Redho	Failed Stage 3
4	August 18, 2018	January 12, 2019	19	Becamex Tokyu Garden City, Bình Dương, Ho Chi Minh City	800.000.000₫	Mat Redho	Failed Stage 3
5	July 22, 2019	December 2, 2019	18	Becamex Tokyu Garden City, Bình Dương, Ho Chi Minh City	800.000.000₫	Trần Minh Khương	Failed Stage 3
6	2026	2026	TBA	Hanoi Circuit, Nam Từ Liêm, Hanoi	TBA	TBA	TBA
International Competition (also known as Vietnam vs. The World or Sasuke Vietnam: All-Stars)
1	2015	2015	2	Becamex Tokyu Garden City, Bình Dương, Ho Chi Minh City	50.000.000₫	Team International	Team Champion
2	2016	2016	2	Becamex Tokyu Garden City, Bình Dương, Ho Chi Minh City	50.000.000₫	Team Vietnam	Team Champion
3	2018	2018	1	Becamex Tokyu Garden City, Bình Dương, Ho Chi Minh City	30.000.000₫	Team Vietnam 2	Team Champion
4	2019	2019	2	Becamex Tokyu Garden City, Bình Dương, Ho Chi Minh City	30.000.000₫	Team Fire (Vietnam)	Team Champion
Team Competition
1	2017	2017	2	Becamex Tokyu Garden City, Bình Dương, Ho Chi Minh City	50.000.000₫	Green Team	Team Champion

Indicates champions who received winner's prize.

== Spin-offs ==
=== Sasuke Vietnam: All-Stars ===
Sasuke Vietnam: All-Stars, previously known as Vietnam vs. The World is an international team competition and also as television special aired approximately once a year on VTV3. It features an Sasuke Vietnam team from Vietnam competing against teams from other countries or regions around the world, such as Japan and international, for bragging rights and the Sasuke Vietnam: All-Stars trophy. The competitors race on the same Mount Midoriyama course used in Becamex Tokyu Garden City, Bình Dương, Ho Chi Minh City.

=== Sasuke Vietnam: Team Competition ===
In the third season, Sasuke Vietnam: All-Stars was not held for an unknown reason. Instead, a special team competition was held with a similar format to the Sasuke Vietnam: All-Stars during the first two seasons, except with all teams in Vietnam.

== Incidents ==
According to director Masato Inui and Ryo Matachi in a Twitter post, before start taping the first season, on April 21, 2015, a tornado hit the course in Becamex Tokyu Garden City, Bình Dương, Ho Chi Minh City. Luckily, no one were injured after the incident, but the tornado collapsed a structure part of the course. Director Lại Bắc Hải Đăng said about the incident in a post about the 5th Anniversary of Sasuke Vietnam that "The weather is the biggest problem. Rain, wind, storms... caused us to collapse the course more than once; we had to edit and stop recording many times."

== See also ==
- List of program broadcast by Vietnam Television
- Quân khu số 1
