= Sasuke Ninja Warrior Indonesia =

- Genre: Sports entertainment Sports game show Reality
- Created by: Ushio Higuchi
- Presented by: Daniel Mananta (International competition); Fadi Iskandar; Pica Priscilla; Sere Kalina
- Country of origin: Indonesia
- Original language: Indonesian
- No. of seasons: 2

Production
- Executive producers: Fabian Dharmawan; Sonny Palandeng; Rachmat Permadi

Original release
- Network: RCTI
- Release: 20 December 2015 – 30 December 2017

Related
- Sasuke; Ninja Warrior UK; American Ninja Warrior; Ninja Warrior Germany; Australian Ninja Warrior; Sasuke Vietnam

Sasuke Ninja Warrior Indonesia (or simply Ninja Warrior Indonesia) is an Indonesian game show and sports entertainment competition, based on the Japanese television series Sasuke which is aired on RCTI.

== Season overview ==
Seasons	Start date	End date	Episodes
1	20 December 2015	1 May 2016	17
2	15 July 2017	30 September 2017	22
Misi Operasi Midoriyama (English: Midoriyama Operation Mission)
1	3 May 2016	5 June 2016	
2	1 October 2017	14 October 2017	8
Spesial Polri (English: Police Special)
2	15 October 2017	28 October 2017	
International Competition
2	25 November 2017	23 December 2017	5
