= American Ninja Warrior: Ninja vs. Ninja =

American reality TV series

- Genre: Sports competition
- Presented by: Matt Iseman; Akbar Gbaja-Biamila; Alex Curry; Kacy Catanzaro
- Country of origin: United States
- Original language: English
- No. of seasons: 3
- No. of episodes: 26

Production
- Executive producers: Arthur Smith; Brian Richardson; Kent Weed
- Production location: Los Angeles, CA
- Camera setup: Multi-camera
- Production companies: A. Smith & Co. Productions; Tokyo Broadcasting System Television, inc.

Original release
- Network: Esquire Network (2016); USA Network (2017–2018)
- Release: January 19, 2016 – June 18, 2018

American Ninja Warrior: Ninja vs. Ninja (formerly Team Ninja Warrior) is an American reality television obstacle racing team competition series and a spin-off of American Ninja Warrior. The series features ANW alumni racing in teams of three against each other, with the winners receiving a cash prize.

== History ==
On October 9, 2015, Esquire Network announced a spin-off of American Ninja Warrior which would feature twenty-four 3-person teams (two men and one woman) of popular ANW alumni. The teams competed head-to-head against each other, running the course simultaneously, thus creating a new live duel dynamic. The two teams with the fastest times advance to the finale where one team will be crowned the winners and receive a cash prize. Matt Iseman and Akbar Gbaja-Biamila host alongside actor and journalist, Alex Curry. The series is Esquire Network's most-watched program in the channel's history.

On May 31, 2016, Esquire Network announced a sixteen-episode second season that will also include a five-episode special college edition that will have college-aged competitors go head-to-head against rival schools.

On March 6, 2017, it was announced that Team Ninja Warrior would be moving to sibling cable channel USA Network as Esquire Network wound down its linear channel operations and relaunched as an online-only service. The show's second season premiered on April 18.

On October 5, 2017, it was announced by USA Network that the show would be retitled American Ninja Warrior: Ninja vs Ninja starting with the show's third season, which premiered on March 1, 2018.

== Format ==
Each first-round episode consists of five matches: two seeding-round matches, two elimination matches (always pitting a seeding-round winner against a seeding-round loser), and the championship relay race. The four standard rounds features three heats, with the captains selecting opponents (men vs. men only), with the women racing against each other. The third heat is worth double points, with an extra race as a tiebreaker in the event of a 2-2 tie, while the relay race takes place on an extended course.

Once the contestant reaches the Dancing Stones, a contestant who fails any of the next obstacles (which alternate) or the Warped Wall (three-attempt rule in play) automatically loses. The player who advanced the furthest wins the heat, with whoever reached the previous obstacle the fastest being the tie-breaker. A ten-second penalty applies for failure to clear obstacles in the relay race, assessed to the next player on the team. In the relay final, the course's additional obstacles are the Salmon Ladder, Tilting Ladder, and conclude with a 30-foot spider climb leading to a 10-foot rope climb.

In contrast to the ANW rules, but like ANW Junior, which state that touching the water is not allowed, competitors are permitted to make contact with the water, but are disqualified if they completely fall or completely lose their grip on the obstacle. For instance, competitors can drag their feet through the pool on the Sonic Swing, but if they fall completely off the rope, they are disqualified. Often competitors will brush the water in an effort to catch up, but their slick feet most commonly hurt them later on obstacles such as the Warped Wall.

The newest season in 2018 has 36 teams of three competitors each, with major rule changes to the elimination rounds.

Each race will now be worth one point, again with the only restriction that the women must race each other. A team must will all three heats to win the round. If neither team sweeps the heats, the heats will be settled with a relay. Teams will assign competitors to one of three points, the start, after the second, and after the fourth obstacles. To win the match, the team up 2-1 must win one heat to win. If the team down 1-2 wins the heat, the two teams will conduct one sudden death relay to determine the winner. The winners of the two matches will play in the final, now nine obstacles, using the format except in the relay (used in the fourth and fifth heats if necessary), the exchange points will be after the third and sixth obstacles, respectively. Also, there are no more sudden death matches.

== Series overview ==
Season	First aired	Last aired	Champion	Runner-up	Third Place	Fourth Place	Hosts		Sideline reporter
1	January 19, 2016	March 8, 2016	Party Time	Team TNT	Team Ronin	Expendabulls	Matt Iseman	Akbar Gbaja-Biamila	Alex Curry
College Madness	November 22, 2016	December 20, 2016	Wisconsin	MIT	Georgia	UCLA	Matt Iseman	Akbar Gbaja-Biamila	Kacy Catanzaro
2	April 18, 2017	June 27, 2017	Storm Team	Team TNT	Iron Grip	Real Life Beasts	Matt Iseman	Akbar Gbaja-Biamila	Alex Curry
3	March 1, 2018	June 18, 2018	Labreckfast Club	Team Ronin	Iron Grip	Party Time	Matt Iseman	Akbar Gbaja-Biamila	Alex Curry

== Seasons ==
=== Season 1 (2016) ===
The first season of American Team Ninja Warrior occurred in the 2015-2016 TV season. The season was taped from October 21–23, 2015, in Long Beach, California. Of the competing teams, only one team was captained by a woman, that of Jessie Graff's, the "G-Force". Premiering on January 19, 2016, the season consisted of eight, hour-long episodes, exclusively on Esquire Network. The season ended with "Party Time", consisting of members Brian Arnold, Jake Murray, and Jennifer Tavernier crowned Team Ninja Warrior Champions, winning over "TNT", which included members Travis Rosen, Adam Arnold, and Joyce Shahboz.

Team name	Team captain	Team member	Team member	Results	Notes	Refs
Team Alpha	Brent Steffensen	Evan Dollard	Kacy Catanzaro	Eliminated Qualifying Episode 3		
Average Jo Jos	Jo Jo Bynum	Jimmy Bogle Jr.	Caitlin Shukwit	Eliminated Qualifying Episode 1		
Elet-trikz	Elet Hall	Dillon Gates	Cassie Craig	Eliminated Qualifying Episode 5		
Expendabulls	Kevin Bull	Alan Connealy	Luci Romberg	Finalist Episode 3	Eliminated during qualifying in Finals Episode 2	
G-Force	Jessie Graff (Note: Woman captain)	Nicholas Coolridge	Travis Brewer	Eliminated Qualifying Episode 1	Only team with a female captain	
Golden Hearts	Neil Craver	Grant McCartney	Natalie Duran	Eliminated Qualifying Episode 2		
Invincabels	Abel Gonzalez	Nathan Jasso	Jeri D'Aurelio	Eliminated Qualifying Episode 6		
Iron Grip	Daniel Gil	Sam Sann	Richelle Hepler	Eliminated in Relay Showdown Episode 5		
Karsonic Boom	Karson Voiles	Brandon Berrett	Beth Higginbotham	Eliminated Qualifying Episode 4		
Lab Rats	Brian Wilczewski	Chris Wilczewski	Michelle Warnky	Finalist Episode 5	Eliminated during the Relay Showdown in Finals Episode 2	
Team Midoryama	Ian Dory	Dan Yager	Meagan Martin	Finalist Episode 2	Eliminated during qualifying in Finals Episode 1	
Ninja Brittens	Geoff Britten	Dustin McKinney	Jessica Britten	Eliminated Qualifying Episode 5		
NorCal Ninjas	David Campbell	Sean Noble	Rachel Mulvaney	Eliminated Qualifying Episode 2		
Party Time	Brian Arnold	Jake Murray / Travis Weinand (Note: Original team member was injured and replaced by an alternate)	Jennifer Tavernier	(gold) Champion	Jake Murray suffered a leg injury during qualifying and was replaced by Travis Weinand for the Relay Showdown on Qualifying Episode 6	
Rahnaways	Jamie Rahn	Adam Grossman	Courtney Venuti	Eliminated Qualifying Episode 6		
Real Life Beasts	Drew Drechsel	James McGrath	Erica Cook	Eliminated in Relay Showdown Episode 6		
Team Ronin	Flip Rodriguez	JJ Woods	Tiana Webberley	Finalist Episode 4	Eliminated during qualifying in Finals Episode 1	
Storm Team Moravsky	Joe Moravsky	Rob Moravsky	Marybeth Wang	Finalist Episode 1	Originally eliminated in the Relay Showdown in Episode 1 but were brought back as a Wildcard in the Finals; Eliminated during qualifying in Finals Episode 2	
Stratis Faction	Ryan Stratis	Mike Bernardo	Grace Jones	Finalist Episode 3	Originally eliminated in the Relay Showdown in Episode 3 but were brought back as a Wildcard in the Finals; Eliminated during the Relay Showdown in Finals Episode 1	
Think Tank	Noah Kaufman	Matt Wilder	Asya Grechka	Eliminated in Relay Showdown Episode 4		
Team TNT	Travis Rosen	Adam Arnold	Joyce Shahboz	(silver) Runner-up		
Towers of Power	Brandon Mears	Dan Polizzi	Selena Laniel / Traci Dinwiddie	Eliminated in Relay Showdown Episode 2	Selena Laniel suffered a shoulder injury during qualifying and was replaced by Traci Dinwiddie for the Relay Showdown on Qualifying Episode 2	
Tré Amigoz	Tremayne Dortch	Andrew Lowes	Cassandra Dortch	Eliminated Qualifying Episode 3		
Wild Bunch	Lance Pekus	Ben Melick	Rose Wetzel	Eliminated Qualifying Episode 4		

==== Ratings ====
No.	Episode	Air date	Timeslot (ET)	18-49 rating	Viewers (millions)	Daily rank (cable)
1	"Qualifying Week 1"	January 19, 2016	Tuesday 8:00 p.m.	0.09	0.281	105
2	"Qualifying Week 2"	January 26, 2016	Tuesday 8:00 p.m.	0.10	0.273	105
3	"Qualifying Week 3"	February 2, 2016	Tuesday 8:00 p.m.	0.07	0.217	143
4	"Qualifying Week 4"	February 9, 2016	Tuesday 8:00 p.m.	0.10	0.285	114
5	"Qualifying Week 5"	February 16, 2016	Tuesday 8:00 p.m.	0.07	0.200	141
6	"Qualifying Week 6"	February 23, 2016	Tuesday 8:00 p.m.	0.08	0.268	132
7	"Finals Week 1"	March 1, 2016	Tuesday 8:00 p.m.	—N/a	—N/a	>150
8	"Finals Week 2"	March 8, 2016	Tuesday 8:00 p.m.	0.12	0.295	115

=== College Madness (2016) ===
Team Ninja Warrior: College Madness was a five-episode special season that premiered on November 22, 2016, on Esquire Network. Each episode featured teams, each consisting of two men and one woman, competing against other teams from various colleges and universities across the United States. At the end of each episode, the top two teams faced each other in a relay race, with the winner advancing to the finals. Matt Iseman and Akbar Gbaja-Biamila hosted with ANW fan favorite Kacy Catanzaro as the sideline reporter. The tournament was ultimately won by the University of Wisconsin, with a team consisting of Zack Kemmerer, Andrew Philibeck, and Taylor Amann.

Team name	Team member	Team member	Team member	Results	Notes	Refs
UCLA Bruins	Carter Allen	James Vaughn	Amanda Adams	(bronze) Finalist		
Colorado Buffaloes	Bobby Reedy	Matt Normile	Alexandra Regenold	Eliminated Qualifying Episode 3		
UConn Huskies	Perry Madison	Luke Adams	Jade Sharkany	Eliminated Qualifying Episode 2		
Florida Gators	Garrison Kalvin	Dane Brooks	Melissa Hill	Eliminated Qualifying Episode 1		
Georgia Bulldogs	Doug Legg	Bradley Schleicher	Victoria Case	(bronze) Finalist		
Houston Cougars	Mathis "The Kid" Owhadi	Zach Tamayo	Haley Houston	Eliminated in Relay Showdown Week 1		
Maryland Terrapins	Marcos Colon-Pappaterra	Kevin Merrick	Delaney Jordan	Eliminated in Relay Showdown Week 4		
Michigan Wolverines	Karl Berkemeier	Joseph Craig	Liv Lang	Eliminated Qualifying Episode 4		
MIT Engineers	Tomas Cabrera	Charlie Andrews	Amelia Becker	(silver) Runner-up		
Ohio State Buckeyes	CJ Raterman	Clay Raterman	Brynn Schlemitz	Eliminated Qualifying Episode 4		
Oklahoma Sooners	Taylor Neitsch	Reese Tomberlin	Candace Caldwell	Eliminated Qualifying Episode 2		
USC Trojans	Antonio Ayala	Julian Olea	Noelle Crowley	Eliminated in Relay Showdown Week 3		
Stanford Cardinal	Nam Cuong	Will Roderick	Roshena MacPherson	Eliminated Qualifying Episode 3		
Texas A&M Aggies	Will Smithee	Collin Hummel	Kaiti Haymaker	Eliminated in Relay Showdown Week 2		
TCU Horned Frogs	Nolan Smith	Alexander Parris	Emma Beserra	Eliminated Qualifying Episode 1		
Wisconsin Badgers	Zack Kemmerer	Andrew Philibeck	Taylor Amann	(gold) Champion		

=== Season 2 (2017) ===
The second season of Team American Ninja Warrior premiered on USA Network on April 18, 2017, with the season finale airing June 27, 2017. There were 28 teams; unlike season 1, in which only one team was captained by a woman, season 2 featured 3 teams captained by women. The season ended with Storm Team, led by Joe Moravsky, being crowned as the new champions, with Travis Rosen's Team TNT finishing runner-up for the second year in a row.

Team name	Team captain	Team member	Team member	Result	Notes	Refs
Team Alpha	Brent Steffensen	Dillon Gates	Kacy Catanzaro	Eliminated Qualifying Episode 5		
Average JoJo's	JoJo Bynum	Jimmy Bogle Jr	Kirsti Pratt	Eliminated Qualifying Episode 3		
The Ballers	Lorin Ball	Paul Kasemir	Meiling Huang	Eliminated in Relay Showdown Episode 6		
Flowmingo	Alan Connealy	JB Douglas	Luci Romberg	Eliminated Qualifying Episode 5		
G-Force	Jessie Graff	Nicholas Coolridge	Jesse La Flair	Eliminated Qualifying Episode 3	One of three teams with female captains	
Golden Hearts	Neil Craver	Grant McCartney	Natalie Duran	Finalist Episode 1	Eliminated during Qualifying in Finals Episode 2; Natalie Duran injured her ankle when she dismounted from the Tire Swing during the knockout round (Finals Episode 2) and was unable to finish her run	
Team Grit	Kevin Bull	Lance Pekus	Maggi Thorne	Eliminated Qualifying Episode 4		
Invincabels	Abel Gonzalez	Geoff Lancaster	Jeri D'Aurelio	Eliminated Qualifying Episode 7		
Iron Grip	Daniel Gil	Nate Burkhalter/Scott Willson	Barclay Stockett	(bronze) Finalist	Eliminated during the Relay Showdown in Finals Episode 1; Nate Burkhalter injured his shoulder during the qualifying round in Finals Episode 1 and was unable to continue, and alternate Scott Willson replaced him	
Karsten's Fast Kats	Karsten Williams	Kevin Klein	Joy Strickland	Eliminated in Relay Showdown Episode 5	Returned in Wildcard Episode 2 but lost in the Relay Showdown again	
Lab Rats	Chris Wilczewski (Note: The captain was injured and remained captain while existing team member took over as top team competitor) / Brian Wilczewski	Brian Wilczewski / Arnold Hernandez	Michelle Warnky	Eliminated in Relay Showdown Episode 4	Team Captain Chris Wilczewski suffered an injury during qualifying, teammate Brian Wilczewski took over his on-course role, while injury replacement Arnold Hernandez took over Brian's spot, while Chris remained captain off-course	
Labreckfast Club	Jesse Labreck	Jon Alexis Jr	Noel Reyes	Eliminated Qualifying Episode 6	One of three teams with female captains	
Mega Crushers	Meagan Martin	Ian Dory	Dan Yager	Eliminated Qualifying Episode 2	One of three teams with female captains	
Ninja Brittens	Geoff Britten	Jessica Britten/Sarah Schoback	Mike Chick	Eliminated Qualifying Episode 7	Jessica Britten was replaced by Sarah Schoback due to heat exhaustion	
NorCal Ninjas	David Campbell	Brian Kretsch/Sean Bryan	Anna Shumaker	Finalist Wildcard Episode 2	Originally eliminated in the Relay Showdown in Episode 1 but went on to win in Wildcard Episode 2; Brian Kretsch suffered a shoulder injury during Wildcard Episode 2 and was replaced by alternate Sean Bryan; eliminated during Qualifying in Finals Episode 2	
Party Time	Brian Arnold	Jake Murray	Jennifer Tavernier	Eliminated Qualifying Episode 1		
Phoenix Force	Najee Richardson	Dan Galiczynski	Cassie Craig	Eliminated Qualifying Episode 4		
Real Life Beasts	Drew Drechsel	James McGrath	Erica Cook/Sarah Schoback	(bronze) Finalist	McGrath injured his shoulder during his first run in Qualifying, but was able to continue; Erica Cook had ACL injury during the knockout round in Finals Episode 2 and was replaced in the Relay Showdown by Sarah Schoback; eliminated during Relay Showdown in Finals Episode 2	
Team Ronin	Flip Rodriguez	JJ Woods	Tiana Webberley	Finalist Episode 7	Eliminated during qualifying in Finals Episode 1	
Storm Team	Joe Moravsky	Josh Levin	Allyssa Beird	(gold) Champion		
Stratis Faction	Ryan Stratis	Mike Bernardo	Grace Sims	Eliminated Qualifying Episode 6		
Superhero Squad	Jamie Rahn	Sean Darling Hammond	Rachael Goldstein	Eliminated in Relay Showdown Episode 3	The Superhero Squad won the Relay Showdown on Wildcard Episode 1 but then lost to the NorCal Ninjas during the Relay Showdown on Wildcard Episode 2	
Team Tarzan	Ben Melick	Travis Weinand	Rose Wetzel	Eliminated Qualifying Episode 2		
Team TNT	Travis Rosen	Brett Sims	Marybeth Wang	(silver) Runner-up	Won the Relay Showdown in Finals Episode 2 but lost to Storm Team in the Championship Relay	
Think Tank	Noah Kaufman	Matt Wilder	Asya Grechka	Finalist Episode 3	Eliminated during qualifying in Finals Episode 1	
Towers of Power	Brandon Mears	Dan Polizzi	Selena Laniel	Eliminated in Relay Showdown Episode 7		
Tre Amigoz	Tremayne Dortch	Andrew Lowes	Melody Schofield	Eliminated Qualifying Episode 1		
The Wings	Thomas Stillings	David Yarter	Melanie Hunt	Eliminated in Relay Showdown Episode 2	Returned in Wildcard Episode 1 but lost again in the Relay Showdown	

==== Ratings ====
No.	Episode	Air date	Timeslot (ET)	18-49 rating	Viewers (millions)	Daily rank (cable)
1	"Qualifying Week 1"	April 18, 2017	Tuesday 10:00 p.m.	0.31	0.942	15
2	"Qualifying Week 2"	April 25, 2017	Tuesday 10:00 p.m.	0.28	0.929	23
3	"Qualifying Week 3"	May 2, 2017	Tuesday 10:00 p.m.	0.30	0.862	22
4	"Qualifying Week 4"	May 9, 2017	Tuesday 10:00 p.m.	0.30	0.870	29
5	"Qualifying Week 5"	May 16, 2017	Tuesday 10:00 p.m.	0.27	0.848	32
6	"Qualifying Week 6"	May 23, 2017	Tuesday 10:00 p.m.	0.27	0.813	28
7	"Qualifying Week 7"	May 30, 2017	Tuesday 10:00 p.m.	0.37	1.117	10
8	"Wildcard Week 1"	June 6, 2017	Tuesday 10:00 p.m.	0.35	1.064	13
9	"Wildcard Week 2"	June 13, 2017	Tuesday 10:00 p.m.	0.30	0.954	26
10	"Finals Week 1"	June 20, 2017	Tuesday 10:00 p.m.	0.38	1.170	10
11	"Finals Week 2"	June 27, 2017	Tuesday 10:00 p.m.	0.33	1.010	13

=== Season 3 (2018) ===
Season 3 of the show, now dubbed as American Ninja Warrior: Ninja vs. Ninja, premiered on March 1, 2018 with the finale airing on June 18, 2018. The competition was won by the only female-led team, Jesse “Flex” Labreck’s Labreckfast Club.

Team Name	Team Captain	Team Member	Team Member	Result	Notes
All-American Ninjas	Jonathan Horton/Reko Rivera	Paul Hamm	April Steiner Bennett	Eliminated Qualifying Episode 3	Returned in Wild Card episode 1 but lost to Frostbite; Jonathan Horton injured his foot prior to Wild Card episode 1 and was unable to compete, thus he was replaced by alternate Reko Rivera
Team Alpha	Brent Steffensen	David Yarter	Sydney Olson	Eliminated Qualifying Episode 6	
Average JoJo's	JoJo Bynum	Jimmy Bogle Jr	Jessica Clayton	Eliminated Qualifying Episode 5	
The Ballers	Lorin Ball	Paul Kasemir	Meiling Huang	Eliminated Qualifying Playoffs Episode 4	Originally eliminated during qualifying in Episode 6, but then defeated Three Wishes to advance to the playoffs; eliminated by Team Ronin in the playoffs
Beasts from the East	James McGrath	Dave Cavanagh	Erica Cook	Eliminated Qualifying Playoffs Episode 1	Originally eliminated during qualifying in Episode 1 but then defeated the Wisco Warriors in Wild Card Episode 2 to advance to the playoffs; eliminated by Iron Grip in the playoffs
Big Dog Ninjas	Jody Avila	Josh Salinas	Brandi Monteverde	Eliminated Qualifying Episode 6	Returned in Wild Card episode 2 but lost to the Hashtag Ninjas
Brazi Bros	Lucas Gomes	Alexio Gomes	Brittany Reid	Eliminated Qualifying Episode 3	
Dark Horse	Lance Pekus	Karson Voiles	Tammy McClure	Eliminated Qualifying Episode 2	Returned in Wild Card episode 1 but lost to NorCal Ninjas
Expendabulls	Kevin Bull	Thaddeus Robeck	Maggi Thorne	Eliminated Qualifying Episode 7	
Frostbite	Nick Hanson	Jackson Meyer	Zhanique Lovett	Eliminated Qualifying Playoffs Episode 2	Originally eliminated during qualifying in episode 8 but then defeated the All-American Ninjas to advance to the playoffs; eliminated by Labreckfast club in the playoffs
Golden Hearts	Neil Craver	Grant McCartney	Natalie Duran	Eliminated Relay Showdown Playoffs Episode 1	Won Episode 5 to advance to the playoffs; lost to Iron Grip in relay showdown in the playoffs
Hashtag Ninjas	Nicholas Coolridge	Jesse La Flair	Larissa Cottle	Eliminated Qualifying Playoffs Episode 3	Originally eliminated during qualifying in Episode 1 but then defeated the Big Dog Ninjas to advance to the playoffs; eliminated by Party Time in the playoffs
Hazard Brigade	Mike Bernardo	Mike Needham	Grace Sims	Eliminated Qualifying Episode 9	Returned in Wild Card Episode 2 but lost to Team Wolfpack
Invincabels	Abel Gonzalez	Marybeth Wang	Victor Juarez	Eliminated Qualifying Episode 7	
Iron Grip	Daniel Gil	Tiana Webberley	Mathis Owhadi	(bronze) Finalist	Won Episode 7 to advance to the playoffs; eliminated in qualifying by Team Ronin during Finals
Karsten's Fast Kats	Karsten Williams	Kevin Klein	Lauren Keen	Eliminated Qualifying Episode 3	
Lab Rats	Chris Wilczewski	Brian Wilczewski	Michelle Warnky	Eliminated Relay Showdown Playoffs Episode 4	Won Episode 6 to advance to the playoffs; lost to Team Ronin in relay showdown in the playoffs
Labreckfast Club	Jesse Labreck	Jon Alexis Jr	Chris DiGangi	(gold) Champion	Only team with a female captain; Won Episode 2 to advance to the playoffs and defeated Team Ronin to win the championship
Lizard Kings	Hunter Guerard	Sarah Schoback	Kyle Soderman	Eliminated Qualifying Playoffs Episode 3	Originally eliminated during qualifying in episode 7, but then defeated Midwest Muscle in Wild Card episode 1 to advance to the playoffs; eliminated by Tri-Hards in the playoffs
Midwest Muscle	Tyler Yamauchi	Ethan Swanson	Kirsti Pratt	Eliminated Qualifying Episode 2	Returned in Wild Card episode 1 but lost to Lizard Kings
NorCal Ninjas	David Campbell	Brian Kretsch	Anna Shumaker	Eliminated Qualifying Playoffs Episode 1	Originally eliminated during qualifying in episode 4, but then beat Dark Horse in Wild Card Episode 1 to advance to the playoffs; eliminated by Golden Hearts in the playoffs
Party Time	Brian Arnold	Jake Murray	Barclay Stockett	(bronze) Finalist	Won Episode 3 to advance to the playoffs; eliminated in qualifying by Labreckfast Club during Finals
Phoenix Force	Najee Richardson	Michael Torres	Cassie Craig	Eliminated Qualifying Playoffs Episode 2	Won Episode 8 to advance to the playoffs; eliminated by Team Wolfpack in the playoffs
Team Ronin	Flip Rodriguez	JJ Woods	Meagan Martin	(silver) Runner-up	Won Episode 1 to advance to the playoffs; defeated in the championship relay by Labreckfast Club in the Finals
Superhero Squad	Jamie Rahn	Sean Darling-Hammond	Rachael Goldstein	Eliminated Qualifying Episode 9	
Team Tarzan	Ben Melick	Travis Weinand	Emmi Rose	Eliminated Qualifying Episode 2	
Think Tank	Noah Kaufman	Matt Wilder	Leila Noone	Eliminated Qualifying Episode 8	
Three Wishes	Thomas Stillings	Brittany Hanks	Brian Burkhardt/Geoff Lancaster	Eliminated Qualifying Episode 5	Brian Burkhardt injured his shoulder during the first Relay Showdown and was replaced in the second by alternate Geoff Lancaster; returned in Wild Card episode 2 but lost to the Ballers
Team TNT	Travis Rosen	Brett Sims	Emily Durham	Eliminated Qualifying Episode 8	
Towers of Power	Dan Polizzi	Selena Laniel	Nate Burkhalter	Eliminated Qualifying Episode 5	
Tre Amigoz	Tremayne Dortch	Andrew Lowes	Meghan Beatty	Eliminated Qualifying Episode 4	
Tri-Hards	Sean Bryan	Adam Rayl	Rebekah Bonilla	Eliminated Relay Showdown Playoffs Episode 3	Won Episode 9 to advance to the playoffs; lost to Party Time in relay showdown in the playoffs
West Coast Warriors	Alan Connealy	JB Douglas	Lindsey Eskildsen	Eliminated Qualifying Episode 1	
Wisco Warriors	Drew Knapp	Sara Heesen/Christine Ahn	Andrew Philibeck	Eliminated Qualifying Episode 9	Returned in Wild Card Episode 2 but lost to the Beasts from the East; Sara Heesen injured her sternum during qualifying in Episode 9 and was replaced in the Wild Card round by alternate Christine Ahn
Team Wolfpack	Ian Dory	Jeri D'Aurelio	Dan Yager	Eliminated Relay Showdown Playoffs Episode 2	Originally eliminated during qualifying in Episode 4 but then defeated Hazard Brigade to advance to the playoffs; lost to Labreckfast club in relay showdown in the playoffs
Young Bloods	Tyler Gillett	Kevin Carbone	Bree Widener	Eliminated Qualifying Playoffs Episode 4	Won Episode 4 to advance to the playoffs; eliminated by Lab Rats in the playoffs

==== Ratings ====
No.	Episode	Air date	Timeslot (ET)	18-49 rating	Viewers (millions)	Daily rank (cable)
1	"Qualifying Episode 1"	March 1, 2018	Thursday 9:00 p.m.	0.21	0.626	48
2	"Qualifying Episode 2"	March 8, 2018	Thursday 9:00 p.m.	0.22	0.692	35
3	"Qualifying Episode 3"	March 15, 2018	Thursday 9:00 p.m.	0.21	0.600	51
4	"Qualifying Episode 4"	March 22, 2018	Thursday 9:00 p.m.	0.22	0.647	38
5	"Qualifying Episode 5"	March 29, 2018	Thursday 9:00 p.m.	0.21	0.633	41
6	"Qualifying Episode 6"	April 5, 2018	Thursday 9:00 p.m.	0.21	0.599	35
7	"Qualifying Episode 7"	April 9, 2018	Monday 11:05 p.m.	0.31	0.759	21
8	"Qualifying Episode 8"	April 16, 2018	Monday 11:05 p.m.	0.32	0.818	21
9	"Qualifying Episode 9"	April 23, 2018	Monday 11:05 p.m.	0.23	0.717	33
10	"Wildcard Episode 1"	April 30, 2018	Monday 11:05 p.m.	0.29	0.780	22
11	"Wildcard Episode 2"	May 7, 2018	Monday 11:05 p.m.	0.24	0.712	27
12	"Playoffs Episode 1"	May 14, 2018	Monday 11:05 p.m.	0.27	0.739	20
13	"Playoffs Episode 2"	May 28, 2018	Monday 11:05 p.m.	0.24	0.774	34
14	"Playoffs Episode 3"	June 4, 2018	Monday 11:05 p.m.	0.23	0.725	32
15	"Playoffs Episode 4"	June 11, 2018	Monday 11:05 p.m.	0.32	0.839	21
16	"The Finals"	June 18, 2018	Monday 11:05 p.m.	0.25	0.761	27

== Ratings ==
Season	Time slot (ET)	Episodes	Premiered		Ended		Network	TV season	Title
Season	Time slot (ET)	Episodes	Date	Premiere viewers (millions)	Date	Finale viewers (millions)	Network	TV season	Title
1	Tuesday 8:00 pm	8	January 19, 2016	0.281	March 8, 2016	0.295	Esquire Network	2015-16	Team Ninja Warrior
College Madness	Tuesday 8:00 pm	5	November 22, 2016	—N/a	December 20, 2016	—N/a	Esquire Network	2016-17	Team Ninja Warrior
2	Tuesday 10:00 pm	11	April 18, 2017	0.942	June 27, 2017	1.010	USA	2016-17	Team Ninja Warrior
3	Thursday 9:00 pm (1-6); Monday 11:05 pm (7-16)	16	March 1, 2018	0.626	June 18, 2018	0.761	USA	2017-18	American Ninja Warrior: Ninja vs. Ninja

Broadcast syndication

The series aired on Esquire Network for Season 1 only in 2016. The second season premiered on USA due to Esquire's shutdown as a TV network, as well as third season premiering in 2018. In addition to American Ninja Warrior Jr., Universal Kids acquired the rights to the series and started airing it in 2019.

== Spin-offs ==
=== Foreign editions ===
- Team Ninja Warrior Denmark (Danish: Team Ninja Warrior Danmark) premiered on 4 September 2016 on Kanal 5.
- Team Ninja Warrior Germany will premiere in 2018 on RTL.
- Ninja Warrior Poland: Ninja vs. Ninja (Polish: Ninja vs. Ninja NWP) will premiere on 4 March 2025 on Polsat. Unlike other versions, this spin-off was served as the tenth season of Ninja Warrior Poland (Polish: Ninja Warrior Polska).
