= 2008 United States Olympic trials (track and field) =

- Dates: June 27–July 8
- Host city: Eugene, Oregon, United States
- Venue: Hayward Field
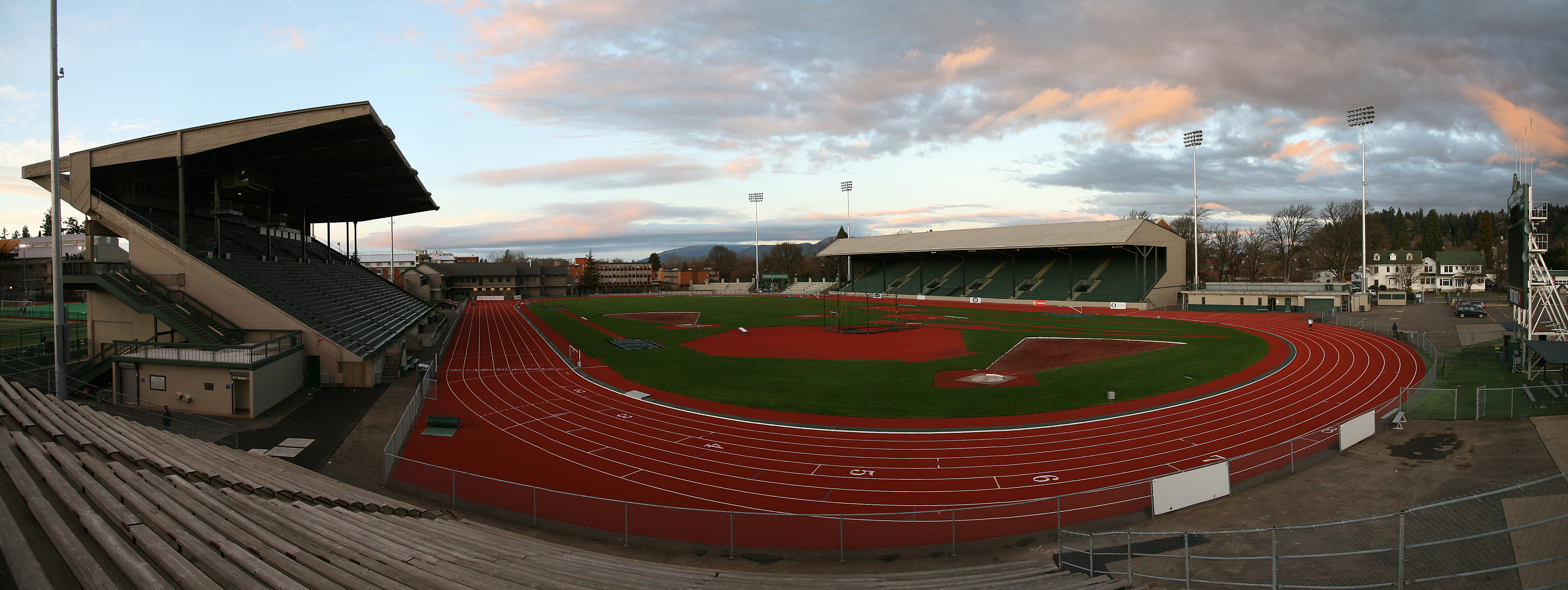
- Level: Senior
- Type: Outdoor
- Events: 40 (men: 20; women: 20)

The 2008 United States Olympic trials for track and field were held at Hayward Field in Eugene, Oregon. Organised by USA Track and Field, the ten-day competition lasted from June 27 until July 8 and served as the national championships in track and field for the United States.

The results of the event determined qualification for the American Olympic team at the 2008 Summer Olympics, held in Beijing. Provided they had achieved the Olympic "A" standard, the top three athletes gained a place on the Olympic team. In the event that a leading athlete did not hold an "A" standard, or an athlete withdrew, the next highest finishing athlete with an "A" standard was selected instead.

The trials for the men's marathon were held November 3, 2007, in New York City, the women's marathon were held April 20 in Boston, and the trials for the men's 50 km race walk were held February 9 in Miami, Florida.

== Medal summary ==
Key: ≠ Athlete without "A" standard, not selected.

=== Men ===
==== Men track events ====
| Event | Gold | | Silver | | Bronze | |
|---|---|---|---|---|---|---|
| 100 metres (Wind: +4.1 m/s) | Tyson Gay | 9.68w | Walter Dix | 9.80w | Darvis Patton | 9.84w |
| 200 metres | Walter Dix | 19.852 | Shawn Crawford | 19.857 | Wallace Spearmon | 19.90 |
| 400 metres | LaShawn Merritt | 44.00 | Jeremy Wariner | 44.20 | David Neville | 44.61 |
| 800 metres See also Oregon Sweep | Nick Symmonds | 1:44.10 | Andrew Wheating | 1:45.03 | Christian Smith | 1:45.47 |
| 1500 metres | Bernard Lagat | 3:40.37 | Leonel Manzano | 3:40.90 | Lopez Lomong | 3:41.00 |
| 5000 metres | Bernard Lagat | 13:27.47 | Matt Tegenkamp | 13:29.68 | Ian Dobson | 13:29.76 |
| 10,000 metres | Abdi Abdirahman | 27:41.89 | Galen Rupp | 27:43.11 | Jorge Torres | 27:46.33 |
| Marathon | Ryan Hall | 2:09:02 | Dathan Ritzenhein | 2:11:07 | Brian Sell | 2:11:40 |
| 110 metres hurdles (Wind: +3.5 m/s) | David Oliver | 12.95w | Terrence Trammell | 13.00w | David Payne | 13.25w |
| 400 metres hurdles | Bershawn Jackson | 48.17 | Kerron Clement | 48.36 | Angelo Taylor | 48.42 |
| 3000 metres steeplechase | Anthony Famiglietti | 8:20.24 | William Nelson | 8:21.47 | Joshua McAdams | 8:21.99 |
| 20 km walk | Kevin Eastler | 1:27:08.00 | Matthew Boyles≠ | 1:28:20.00 | Patrick Stroupe≠ | 1:29:17.00 |

==== Men field events ====
| Event | Gold | | Silver | | Bronze | |
|---|---|---|---|---|---|---|
| High jump | Jesse Williams | 2.30 m (7 ft 6 1/2 in) | Jamie Nieto | 2.27 m (7 ft 5 1/4 in) | Andra Manson | 2.27 m (7 ft 5 1/4 in) |
| Pole vault | Derek Miles | 5.80 m (19 ft 1/4 in) | Jeff Hartwig | 5.70 m (18 ft 8 1/4 in) | Brad Walker | 5.65 m (18 ft 6 1/4 in) |
| Long jump | Trevell Quinley | 8.36 m (27 ft 5 in) | Brian Johnson | 8.30 m (27 ft 2 3/4 in) | Miguel Pate | 8.22 m (26 ft 11 1/2 in) |
| Triple jump | Aarik Wilson | 17.43 m (57 ft 2 in) | Kenta Bell | 17.23 m (56 ft 6 1/4 in) | Rafeeq Curry | 17.21 m (56 ft 5 1/2 in) |
| Shot put | Reese Hoffa | 22.10 m (72 ft 6 in) | Christian Cantwell | 21.71 m (71 ft 2 1/2 in) | Adam Nelson | 20.89 m (68 ft 6 1/4 in) |
| Discus throw | Ian Waltz | 65.87 m (216 ft 1 in) | Michael Robertson | 63.73 m (209 ft 1 in) | Casey Malone | 62.67 m (205 ft 7 in) |
| Hammer throw | A. G. Kruger | 75.56 m (247 ft 10 in) | Kevin McMahon≠ | 74.49 m (244 ft 4 in) | Jake Freeman | 73.59 m (241 ft 5 in) |
| Javelin throw^{[a]} | Bobby Smith≠ | 76.06 m (249 ft 6 in) | Mike Hazle | 75.76 m (248 ft 6 in) | Brian Chaput≠ | 75.63 m (248 ft 1 in) |
| Decathlon | Bryan Clay | 8832 CR | Trey Hardee | 8534 | Tom Pappas | 8511 |

==== Notes ====
^{a} As a result of Bobby Smith and Brian Chaput not having the "A" standard of 77.00 m, fifth-placed Leigh Smith and Breaux Greer who was eliminated in the preliminary round were included.

=== Women ===
==== Women track events ====
| Event | Gold | | Silver | | Bronze | |
|---|---|---|---|---|---|---|
| 100 metres | Muna Lee | 10.85 | Torri Edwards | 10.90 | Lauryn Williams | 10.90 |
| 200 metres (Wind: +5.6 m/s) | Allyson Felix | 21.82 | Muna Lee | 21.99 | Marshevet Hooker | 22.20 |
| 400 metres | Sanya Richards | 49.89 | Mary Wineberg | 50.85 | DeeDee Trotter | 50.88 |
| 800 metres | Hazel Clark | 1:59.82 | Alice Schmidt | 2:00.46 | Kameisha Bennett | 2:01.20 |
| 1500 metres | Shannon Rowbury | 4:05.48 | Erin Donohue | 4:08.20 | Christin Wurth | 4:08.48 |
| 5000 metres | Kara Goucher | 15:01.02 | Jennifer Rhines | 15:02.02 | Shalane Flanagan | 15:02.81 |
| 10,000 metres | Shalane Flanagan | 31:34.81 | Kara Goucher | 31:37.72 | Amy Begley | 31:43.60 |
| Marathon | Deena Kastor | 2:29:35 | Magdalena Lewy Boulet | 2:30:19 | Blake Russell | 2:32:40 |
| 100 metres hurdles wind +3.8 | Lolo Jones | 12.29 | Damu Cherry | 12.58 | Dawn Harper | 12.62 |
| 400 metres hurdles | Tiffany Williams | 54.03 | Queen Harrison | 54.60 | Sheena Tosta | 54.62 |
| 3000 metres steeplechase | Anna Willard | 9:27.59 CR | Lindsey Anderson | 9:30.75 | Jennifer Barringer | 9:33.11 |
| 20 km walk | Joanne Dow | 1:35:11.00 | Teresa Vaill≠ | 1:36:35.00 | Susan Armenta≠ | 1:42:12.00 |

==== Women field events ====
| Event | Gold | | Silver | | Bronze | |
|---|---|---|---|---|---|---|
| High jump | Chaunte Howard | 1.97 m (6 ft 5 1/2 in) | Amy Acuff | 1.93 m (6 ft 3 3/4 in) | Sharon Day | 1.91 m (6 ft 3 in) |
| Pole vault | Jennifer Stuczynski | 4.92 m (16 ft 1 1/2 in) NR | April Steiner Bennett | 4.60 m (15 ft 1 in) | Erica Bartolina | 4.55 m (14 ft 11 in) |
| Long jump | Brittney Reese | 6.95 m (22 ft 9 1/2 in) | Grace Upshaw | 6.88 m (22 ft 6 3/4 in) | Funmi Jimoh | 6.72 m (22 ft 1/2 in) |
| Triple jump | Shani Marks | 14.38 m (47 ft 2 in) | Shakeema Welsch≠ | 14.27 m (46 ft 9 3/4 in) | Erica McLain | 13.96 m (45 ft 9 1/2 in) |
| Shot put | Michelle Carter | 18.85 m (61 ft 10 in) | Kristin Heaston | 18.34 m (60 ft 2 in) | Jillian Camarena | 18.12 m (59 ft 5 1/4 in) |
| Discus throw | Aretha Thurmond | 65.20 m (213 ft 10 in) | Suzy Powell-Roos | 62.92 m (206 ft 5 in) | Stephanie Brown Trafton | 62.65 m (205 ft 6 in) |
| Hammer throw | Jessica Cosby | 70.72 m (232 ft 0 in) CR | Amber Campbell | 69.24 m (227 ft 1 in) | Sarah Veress | 68.60 m (225 ft 0 in) |
| Javelin throw^{[b]} | Kara Patterson | 61.51 m (201 ft 9 in) | Dana Pounds≠ | 59.79 m (196 ft 1 in) | Rachel Yurkovich≠ | 58.04 m (190 ft 5 in) |
| Heptathlon | Hyleas Fountain | 6667 pts | Jacquelyn Johnson | 6347 pts | Diana Pickler | 6257 pts |

==== Notes ====
^{b} As neither Dana Pounds or Rachel Yurkovich met the "A" standard of 60.50 m, fourth-placed Kim Kreiner was included.
