= 2007 USA Indoor Track and Field Championships =

- Dates: February 24-25
- Host city: Boston, Massachusetts, United States
- Venue: Reggie Lewis Track and Athletic Center
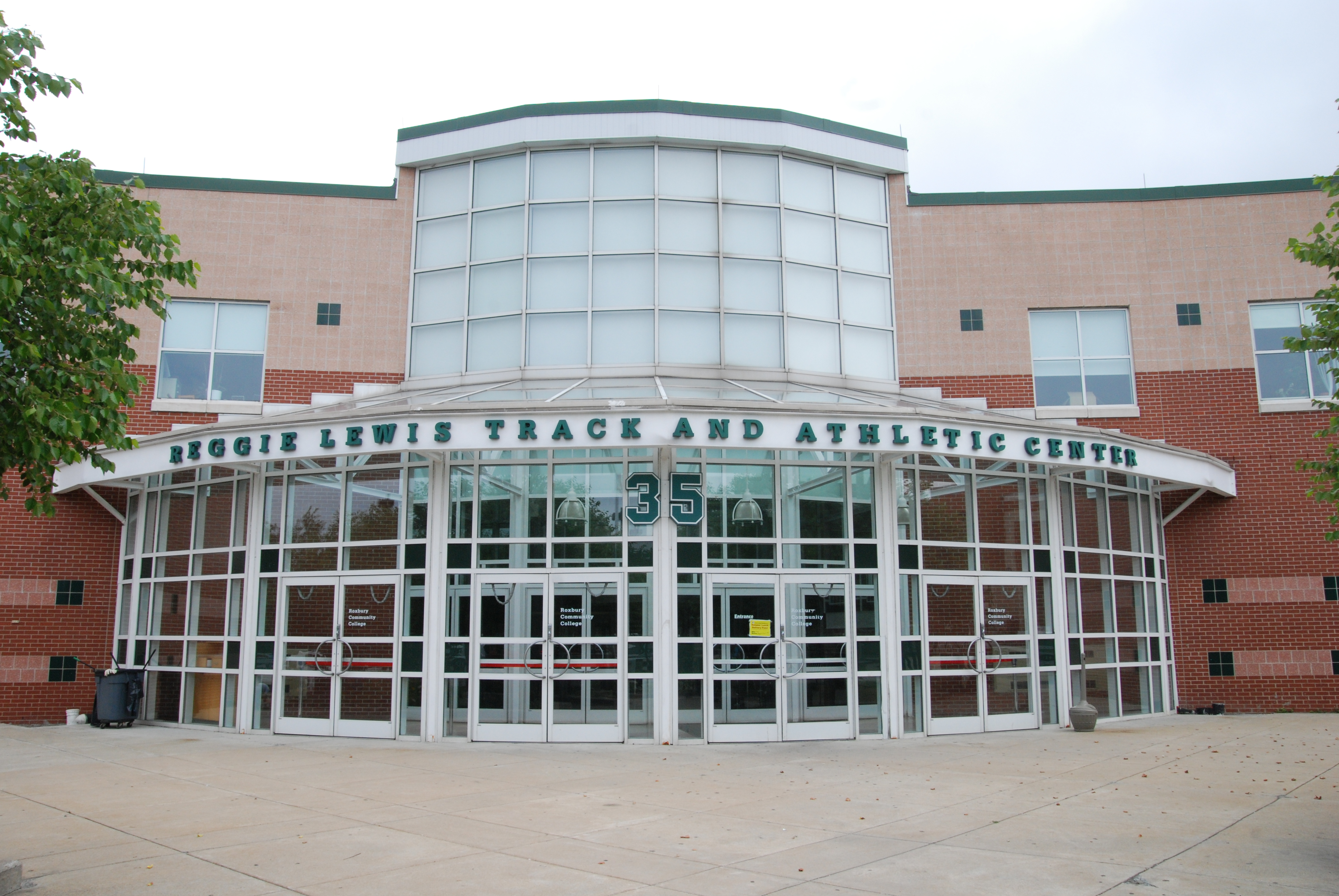
- Level: Senior
- Type: Indoor
- Events: 28 (14 men's + 14 women's)

The 2007 USA Indoor Track and Field Championships were held at the Reggie Lewis Track and Athletic Center in Boston, Massachusetts. Organized by USA Track and Field (USATF), the two-day competition took place February 24-25 and served as the national championships in indoor track and field for the United States. The championships in combined track and field events were held at a later date.

At the meeting, Alan Webb was noted for his unusual tactics in winning the men's mile, toying with the field.

== Medal summary ==
=== Men ===
Event	Gold		Silver		Bronze	
60 m	Dabryan Blanton	6.56	Marcus Brunson	6.58	Kyle Farmer	6.62
400 m	Greg Nixon	46.75	Fernada Blakely	46.97	Darold Williamson	47.21
800 m	Nicholas Symmonds	1:48.73	Samuel Burley	1:49.42	Tim Ramirez	1:49.59
Mile run	Alan Webb	4:01.07	Rob Myers	4:01.78	Gabriel Jennings	4:01.93
3000 m	Matt Tegenkamp	7:46.08	Jonathon Riley	7:49.73	Sean Graham	7:52.31
60 m hurdles	Ron Bramlett	7.47	David Payne	7.51	David Oliver	7.57
5000 m walk	Tim Seaman	19:24.38	Kevin Eastler	19:28.63	Matthew Boyles	19:47.82
High jump	Tora Harris	2.29 m	Jesse Williams	2.29 m	Jamie Nieto	2.23 m
Pole vault	Jeff Hartwig	5.80 m	Russ Buller	5.60 m	Darren Niedermeyer	5.60 m
Long jump	Trevell Quinley	8.06 m	Brian Johnson	8.03 m	Aarik Wilson	8.00 m
Triple jump	Aarik Wilson	17.28 m	Rafeeq Curry	16.54 m	Marc Kellman	16.05 m
Shot put	Christian Cantwell	21.72 m	Reese Hoffa	21.21 m	Dan Taylor	20.32 m
Weight throw	AG Kruger	24.05 m	Thomas Freeman	23.10 m	Michael Mai	22.99 m
Heptathlon	Paul Terek	5960 pts	Chris Boyles	5702 pts	Ryan Olkowski	5414 pts

=== Women ===
Event	Gold		Silver		Bronze	
60 m	Hasani Roseby	7.16	Carmelita Jeter	7.17	Marshevet Hooker	7.22
400 m	De'Hashia Trotter	51.95	Monica Hargrove	52.26	Mary Wineberg	52.31
800 m	Nikeya Green	2:02.68	Christin Wurth	2:03.70	Mishael Berger	2:04.58
Mile run	Shayne Culpepper	4:34.42	Sarah Schwald	4:36.12	Christin Wurth	4:36.78
3000 m	Shalane Flanagan	8:56.74	Lisa Galaviz	9:10.75	Emily Field	9:11.32
60 m hurdles	Lolo Jones	7.88	Danielle Carruthers	7.92	Nichole Denby	7.93
3000 m walk	Sam Cohen	13:51.29	Lauren Forgues	13:55.90	Loretta Schuellein	14:14.95
High jump	Amy Acuff	1.92 m	Gwen Wentland	1.86 m	Sheena Gordon	1.86 m
Pole vault	Jennifer Stuczynski	4.60 m	Lacy Janson	4.60 m	Mary Sauer	4.50 m
Long jump	Akiba McKinney	6.55 m	Shameka Marshall	6.38 m	Brianna Glenn	6.35 m
Triple jump	Shani Marks	13.56 m	Tiombe Hurd	13.39 m	Brandy Depland	13.17 m
Shot put	Jillian Camarena	18.46 m	Elizabeth Wanless	17.80 m	Robyn Jarocki	16.90 m
Weight throw	Amber Campbell	24.54 m	Erin Gilreath	22.40 m	Kristal Yush	22.15 m
Pentathlon	Fiona Asigbee	4098 pts	Bridgette Ingram	4097 pts	Lela Nelson	3976 pts
