= American Ninja Warrior season 9 =

Season of American reality/sport competition television series American Ninja Warrior

American Ninja Warrior
- Season 9
- Hosted by: Matt Iseman; Akbar Gbaja-Biamila; Kristine Leahy
- Finals venue: Las Vegas, NV
- No. of episodes: 15

Release
- Original network: NBC
- Original release: June 12 – September 18, 2017

Season chronology
- ← Previous; Season 8 Next → Season 10

The ninth season of American Ninja Warrior premiered on June 12, 2017 on NBC. Hosts Matt Iseman and Akbar Gbaja-Biamila returned for their respective eighth and fifth seasons, alongside sideline reporter Kristine Leahy who returned for her third season. In addition prior to the ninth-season premiere, NBC aired a special ANW Celebrity, Red Nose Day edition featuring nine celebrities, each coached by nine elite ninjas on May 25 before airing USA vs. The World III on June 4.

This year for the first time, the top five women in each city qualifying course qualified for the city finals course, and the top two women in each city finals qualify for national finals, regardless of their placement overall. Beginning in Season 9, wildcard invitations will no longer be allowed for the National Finals in Vegas as only competitors who finish their city finals or those in the Top 15 (men) or Top 2 (women) by the end of the night will advance. Also, the show introduces ANW Obstacle Design Challenge, where from over 2500 fan-submitted obstacles, seven chosen obstacles are introduced in the show.

== Competition schedule ==
Qualifying airing	Finals airing	City	Qualifying date	Finals date	Venue
June 12, 2017	July 24, 2017	Los Angeles, California	March 7, 2017	March 8, 2017	Universal Studios Hollywood
June 19, 2017	July 31, 2017	San Antonio, Texas	March 26, 2017	March 27, 2017	Bexar County Courthouse
June 26, 2017	August 7, 2017	Daytona Beach, Florida	April 7, 2017	April 8, 2017	Daytona International Speedway
July 3, 2017	August 21, 2017	Kansas City, Missouri	April 24, 2017	April 25, 2017	Union Station
July 10, 2017	August 14, 2017	Cleveland, Ohio	May 8, 2017	May 9, 2017	Public Square
July 17, 2017	August 28, 2017	Denver, Colorado	May 23, 2017	May 24, 2017	Civic Center Park

== Obstacles ==
=== City Qualifying & Finals ===
Indicates obstacles created by fans for the "American Ninja Warrior Obstacle Design Challenge".

Event		Obstacle(s)										Finishers
Los Angeles	Qualifying	Floating Steps	Cannonball Drop	Fly Wheels	Block Run	Battering Ram	Warped Wall	N/A				22
Los Angeles	Finals	Floating Steps	Cannonball Drop	Fly Wheels	Block Run	Battering Ram	Warped Wall	Salmon Ladder	Swinging Peg Board	Stair Hopper	Elevator Climb	4
San Antonio	Qualifying	Floating Steps	Tic Toc	Spinning Bridge	Sky Hooks	Pipe Fitter	Warped Wall	N/A				16
San Antonio	Finals	Floating Steps	Tic Toc	Spinning Bridge	Sky Hooks	Pipe Fitter	Warped Wall	Salmon Ladder	Hourglass Drop	Spinball Wizard	Elevator Climb	1
Daytona Beach	Qualifying	Floating Steps	Rolling Pin	Wingnuts	Broken Bridge	Rolling Thunder	Warped Wall	N/A				18
Daytona Beach	Finals	Floating Steps	Rolling Pin	Wingnuts	Broken Bridge	Rolling Thunder	Warped Wall	Salmon Ladder	Giant Cubes	Circuit Board	Elevator Climb	1
Kansas City	Qualifying	Floating Steps	Hang Glider	Broken Pipes	Crank It Up	Bar Hop	Warped Wall	N/A				10
Kansas City	Finals	Floating Steps	Hang Glider	Broken Pipes	Crank It Up	Bar Hop	Warped Wall	Salmon Ladder	Floating Monkey Bars	Iron Maiden	Elevator Climb	0
Cleveland	Qualifying	Floating Steps	Rolling Log	Razor's Edge	Ring Jump	I-Beam Gap	Warped Wall	N/A				14
Cleveland	Finals	Floating Steps	Rolling Log	Razor's Edge	Ring Jump	I-Beam Gap	Warped Wall	Salmon Ladder	Nail Clipper	The Clacker	Elevator Climb	2
Denver	Qualifying	Floating Steps	Ring Swing	Bouncing Spider	Paddle Boards	Rail Runner	Warped Wall	N/A				8
Denver	Finals	Floating Steps	Ring Swing	Bouncing Spider	Paddle Boards	Rail Runner	Warped Wall	Salmon Ladder	The Wedge	Ninjago Roll	Elevator Climb	1

=== National Finals ===
Event	Obstacle(s)								Finishers
Stage 1	Snake Run	Propeller Bar	Double Dipper	Jumping Spider	Parkour Run	Warped Wall	Domino Pipes	Flying Squirrel	41
Stage 2	Giant Ring Swing	Criss Cross Salmon Ladder	Wave Runner	Swing Surfer	Wingnut Alley	Wall Flip	N/A		3
Stage 3	Floating Boards	Keylock Hang	Nail Clipper	Ultimate Cliffhanger	Curved Body	Peg Cloud	Time Bomb	Flying Bar	0
Stage 4	Rope Climb								N/A

== City courses ==
=== Los Angeles ===
==== Qualifying ====
The Los Angeles Qualifying featured two new obstacles, Cannonball Drop and Battering Ram. The night concluded with 22 finishers. Grant McCartney earned the "POM Wonderful Run of the Night" with the fastest time (1:26.37). Other finishers include Adam Rayl and Kevin Bull.

Top 30 Competitors
order	Competitor	Time	Furthest Obstacle
1	Grant McCartney	1:26.37	Finished (POM Wonderful Run of the Night)
2	Adam Rayl	1:29.79	Finished
3	Kevin Bull	1:33.57	Finished
4	Flip Rodriguez	1:58.28	Finished
5	Brian Wilczewski	1:59.15	Finished
6	Sean Bryan	1:59.47	Finished
7	Ryan Robinson	2:02.56	Finished
8	Nick Hanson	2:07.82	Finished
9	Gabe Hurtado	2:09.93	Finished
10	Anthony Trucks	2:20.76	Finished
11	Brent Bundy	2:26.47	Finished
12	Robin Pietschmann	2:29.81	Finished
13	Jackson Meyer	2:31.24	Finished
14	Kapu Gaison	2:37.24	Finished
15	Josh Levin	2:49.62	Finished
16	Riles Nganga	3:02.85	Finished
17	Westley Silvestri	3:09.86	Finished
18	Charlie Andrews	3:19.89	Finished
19	Benjamin Humphrys	3:21.46	Finished
20	Sander Odish	3:25.55	Finished
21	Anton Reichel	3:29.09	Finished
22	Steve Seiver	3:46.62	Finished
23	Daniel Moreno	2:38.19	Failed on Warped Wall
24	Zhanique Lovett	3:10.59	Failed on Warped Wall
25	Tyler Vogt	3:48.15	Failed on Warped Wall
26	Alan Connealy	0:41.10	Failed on Battering Ram
27	David Campbell	0:51.93	Failed on Battering Ram
28	Scott Willson	0:55.92	Failed on Battering Ram
29	K.C. Halik	1:33.18	Failed on Battering Ram
30	Tiana Webberley	1:35.04	Failed on Battering Ram

Top 5 Women
Rank	Competitor	Time	Furthest Obstacle
1	Zhanique Lovett	3:10.59	Failed on Warped Wall
2	Tiana Webberley	1:35.04	Failed on Battering Ram
3	April Steiner Bennett	1:43.51	Failed on Battering Ram
4	Rebekah Bonilla	2:05.65	Failed on Battering Ram
5	Natalie Duran	2:20.17	Failed on Battering Ram

==== Finals ====
The Los Angeles Finals featured two new obstacles, Swinging Peg Board and Elevator Climb. The round concluded with four finishers. The "Papal Ninja" Sean Bryan just edged out concrete worker Adam Rayl (5:07.92) to earn the fastest finish of the night with a time of 5:07.22. Grant McCartney was eliminated after failing the Salmon Ladder, and David Campbell advanced.

Top 15 Competitors
Rank	Competitor	Time	Furthest Obstacle
1	Sean Bryan	5:07.22	Finished
2	Adam Rayl	5:07.92	Finished
3	Charlie Andrews	6:02.21	Finished (POM Wonderful Run of the Night)
4	Josh Levin	6:27.98	Finished
5	Flip Rodriguez	4:49.73	Failed on Elevator Climb
6	Gabe Hurtado	5:50.71	Failed on Elevator Climb
7	Brian Wilczewski	2:31.21	Failed on Stair Hopper
8	Kevin Bull	3:02.40	Failed on Stair Hopper
9	Robin Pietschmann	4:23.90	Failed on Stair Hopper
10	Jackson Meyer	5:03.54	Failed on Stair Hopper
11	Kapu Gaison	3:03.15	Failed on Swinging Peg Board
12	Steve Seiver	3:10.34	Failed on Swinging Peg Board
13	Benjamin Humphrys	3:15.66	Failed on Swinging Peg Board
14	Nick Hanson	3:22.56	Failed on Swinging Peg Board
15	David Campbell	3:29.48	Failed on Swinging Peg Board

Top 2 Women
Rank	Competitor	Time	Furthest Obstacle
1	Rebekah Bonilla	5:26.32	Failed on Swinging Peg Board
2	Zhanique Lovett	3:14.80	Failed on Warped Wall

=== San Antonio ===
==== Qualifying ====
The San Antonio Qualifying featured two new or modified obstacles (Spinning Bridge (modified) and Sky Hooks (new)) and concluded with 16 finishers. Both ANW veteran Brent Steffensen and former Olympic gymnast Jonathan Horton returned to full form by completing the course and moving onto the next round. ANW trainer Daniel Gil earned the "POM Wonderful Run of the Night" with the fastest time (1:43.24). Also, IndyCar racer Conor Daly competed, but failed on the first obstacle. The first woman up the Warped Wall, Kacy Catanzaro, failed the Sky Hooks when the ring slipped off the hook while she was attempting to make a transition, but she placed in the women's top 5 and moved on to the finals.

Top 30 Competitors
Rank	Competitor	Time	Furthest Obstacle
1	Daniel Gil	1:43.24	Finished (POM Wonderful Run of the Night)
2	Thomas Stillings	1:45.76	Finished
3	Josh Salinas	2:10.29	Finished
4	Brian Burkhardt	2:20.61	Finished
5	Karsten Williams	2:23.29	Finished
6	Nicholas Coolridge	2:43.21	Finished
7	Kevin Klein	2:55.51	Finished
8	Grant Clinton	2:56.63	Finished
9	Jody Avila	3:02.59	Finished
10	Andrew Lowes	3:10.98	Finished
11	Brent Steffensen	3:20.38	Finished
12	Victor Juarez	3:28.68	Finished
13	Abel Gonzalez	4:12.63	Finished
14	Jonathan Horton	4:27.28	Finished
15	Tanr Ross	4:35.91	Finished
16	Jonathan Parr	4:39.09	Finished
17	Will Smithee	1:31.49	Failed on Pipefitter
18	Kye Ackel	1:32.05	Failed on Pipefitter
19	David Yarter	1:34.29	Failed on Pipefitter
20	Cass Clawson	1:42.71	Failed on Pipefitter
21	Kenny Niemitalo	1:43.57	Failed on Pipefitter
22	Nate Burkhalter	1:47.51	Failed on Pipefitter
23	Blake Devine	1:47.79	Failed on Pipefitter
24	Brandon Pannell	1:50.86	Failed on Pipefitter
25	Matt Holt	1:50.90	Failed on Pipefitter
26	Damir Okanovic	1:52.29	Failed on Pipefitter
27	Tremayne Dortch	2:01.47	Failed on Pipefitter
28	Sam Ballard	2:13.90	Failed on Pipefitter
29	Jared Bandy	2:28.24	Failed on Pipefitter
30	Barclay Stockett	3:29.71	Failed on Pipefitter

Top 5 Women
Rank	Competitor	Time	Furthest Obstacle
1	Barclay Stockett	3:29.71	Failed on Pipefitter
2	Kacy Catanzaro	1:52.88	Failed on Sky Hooks
3	Sherrie Laureano	1:14.24	Failed on Spinning Bridge
4	Kaiti Haymaker	1:20.76	Failed on Spinning Bridge
5	Brittany Hanks	0:16.65	Failed on Tic Toc

==== Finals ====
The San Antonio Finals featured a new obstacle, Spinball Wizard. The round concluded with only one finisher. Daniel Gil completed the course on the final run with a time of 5:50.65, saving San Antonio from having no finishers, and earned the POM Wonderful Run of the Night, knocking Nate Burkhalter out of the top 15. Also, Kacy Catanzaro did make it past the Sky Hooks, the obstacle she failed on in qualifying, and made it to the Warped Wall, but was unable to make it up the 14.5 foot version. However, she placed in the women's top 2 and moved on to the National Finals.

Top 15 Competitors
Rank	Competitor	Time	Furthest Obstacle
1	Daniel Gil	5:50.65	Finished (POM Wonderful Run of the Night)
2	Thomas Stillings	4:29.25	Failed on Elevator Climb
3	Nicholas Coolridge	5:07.15	Failed on Elevator Climb
4	Brent Steffensen	5:12.38	Failed on Elevator Climb
5	Karsten Williams	2:39.43	Failed on Spinball Wizard
6	Andrew Lowes	3:54.62	Failed on Spinball Wizard
7	Josh Salinas	2:29.64	Failed on Hourglass Drop
8	Brian Burkhardt	2:55.84	Failed on Hourglass Drop
9	Damir Okanovic	3:02.90	Failed on Hourglass Drop
10	Matt Holt	3:19.13	Failed on Hourglass Drop
11	Grant Clinton	3:25.56	Failed on Hourglass Drop
12	Abel Gonzalez	3:25.98	Failed on Hourglass Drop
13	Brandon Pannell	3:29.05	Failed on Hourglass Drop
14	Cass Clawson	3:31.83	Failed on Hourglass Drop
15	Jody Avila	3:32.66	Failed on Hourglass Drop

Top 2 Women
Rank	Competitor	Time	Furthest Obstacle
1	Barclay Stockett	5:43.62	Failed on Hourglass Drop
2	Kacy Catanzaro	4:18.32	Failed on Warped Wall

=== Daytona Beach ===
==== Qualifying ====
The Daytona Beach Qualifying had two new obstacles, one designed by tennis instructor and walk-on competitor Kevin Carbone. He won the ANW Obstacle Design Contest and made it through his own Wingnuts obstacle. The other new obstacle was the Rolling Pin. Gym owner Drew Drechsel earned the "POM Wonderful Run of the Night" with the fastest time (1:10.49). Stuntwoman Jessie Graff finished 26th overall and 1st among the women competitors. Also, NASCAR driver Ben Kennedy competed, but failed on the second obstacle.

Top 30 Competitors
Rank	Competitor	Time	Furthest Obstacle
1	Drew Drechsel	1:10.49	Finished (POM Wonderful Run of the Night)
2	Travis Rosen	1:47.14	Finished
3	Tyler Gillett	2:17.23	Finished
4	Casidy Marks	2:26.80	Finished
5	Tukrong Klengdong	2:30.91	Finished
6	JJ Woods	2:35.07	Finished
7	Brett Sims	2:46.04	Finished
8	Reko Rivera	2:52.38	Finished
9	Ryan Stratis	2:55.19	Finished
10	Lucas Gomes	3:00.21	Finished
11	Sean Darling-Hammond	3:05.77	Finished
12	Nick Patel	3:06.38	Finished
13	Kevin Carbone	3:07.73	Finished
14	Rigel Henry	3:10.73	Finished
15	Alexio Gomes	3:15.04	Finished
16	Dustin Fishman	3:55.24	Finished
17	Michael Johnson	3:56.91	Finished
18	Eddy Stewart	4:16.18	Finished
19	Les Bradley	1:10.57	Failed on Rolling Thunder
20	Michael Murdick	1:27.26	Failed on Rolling Thunder
21	Steven Cen	1:32.99	Failed on Rolling Thunder
22	Bootie Cothran	1:35.58	Failed on Rolling Thunder
23	Faris Xero	1:36.00	Failed on Rolling Thunder
24	Cedric Idudu	1:43.45	Failed on Rolling Thunder
25	Oscar Ramirez	1:45.89	Failed on Rolling Thunder
26	Jessie Graff	1:46.80	Failed on Rolling Thunder
27	Ricky Vu	2:01.47	Failed on Rolling Thunder
28	Josh Butler	2:13.90	Failed on Rolling Thunder
29	Royall Eason	2:28.24	Failed on Rolling Thunder
30	Jonathan Lorch	3:29.71	Failed on Rolling Thunder

Top 5 Women
Rank	Competitor	Time	Furthest Obstacle
1	Jessie Graff	1:46.80	Failed on Rolling Thunder
2	Lindsay Eskildsen	2:21.13	Failed on Rolling Thunder
3	Bree Widener	2:53.67	Failed on Rolling Thunder
4	Emily Durham	0:31.54	Failed on Wingnuts
5	Adriane Alvord	0:51.59	Failed on Wingnuts

==== Finals ====
The Daytona Beach Finals had a new obstacle, the Giant Cubes. The round concluded with only one finisher. Drew Drechsel completed the course on the final run with a time of 7:34.60, saving Daytona Beach from having no finishers, and earned the "POM Wonderful Run of the Night", knocking Eddy Stewart out of the top 15. Jessie Graff became the first woman to reach the Elevator Climb. Ricky Vu exited on the first obstacle due to leg cramps. JJ Woods was looking strong on the Elevator Climb, but his grip gave out before he could reach the top.

Obstacles used, in addition to those during the qualifiers, for the Daytona Beach Finals are listed below.

Top 15 Competitors
Rank	Competitor	Time	Furthest Obstacle
1	Drew Drechsel	7:34.60	Finished (POM Wonderful Run of the Night)
2	JJ Woods	6:20.96	Failed on Elevator Climb
3	Sean Darling-Hammond	6:26.03	Failed on Elevator Climb
4	Jessie Graff	7:04.29	Failed on Elevator Climb
5	Travis Rosen	3:41.07	Failed on Circuit Board
6	Casidy Marks	3:47.40	Failed on Circuit Board
7	Tyler Gillett	3:47.60	Failed on Circuit Board
8	Kevin Carbone	4:51.35	Failed on Circuit Board
9	Rigel Henry	2:47.71	Failed on Giant Cubes
10	Nick Patel	3:44.59	Failed on Giant Cubes
11	Lucas Gomes	3:52.87	Failed on Giant Cubes
12	Reko Rivera	3:53.30	Failed on Giant Cubes
13	Ryan Stratis	3:58.95	Failed on Giant Cubes
14	Dustin Fishman	4:00.02	Failed on Giant Cubes
15	Michael Johnson	4:08.65	Failed on Giant Cubes

Top 2 Women
Rank	Competitor	Time	Furthest Obstacle
1	Jessie Graff	8:15.71	Failed on Elevator Climb
2	Lindsay Eskildsen	1:39.58	Failed on Rolling Thunder

=== Kansas City ===
==== Qualifying ====
The Kansas City Qualifying round had three new obstacles, the Hang Glider, the Broken Pipes, and Crank it Up. Lance Pekus earned the "POM Wonderful Run of the Night" with the fastest time (2:10.16). Other finishers include Brandon Mears, Tyler Yamauchi, Tyler Smith, and Ethan Swanson.

Top 30 Competitors
Rank	Competitor	Time	Furthest Obstacle
1	Lance Pekus	2:10.16	Finished (POM Wonderful Run of the Night)
2	Brandon Mears	2:41.91	Finished
3	Tyler Yamauchi	2:47.69	Finished
4	Tyler Smith	2:54.34	Finished
5	Ethan Swanson	2:59.94	Finished
6	Broc Bebout	3:05.35	Finished
7	Dave Cavanagh	3:27.51	Finished
8	Ben Baker	3:55.90	Finished
9	Jelani Allen	4:06.31	Finished
10	Dennis Lappin	4:09.10	Finished
11	Devin Harrelson	3:20.15	Failed on Warped Wall
12	Todd Mitchell	4:37.09	Failed on Warped Wall
13	Hunter Guerard	1:04.13	Failed on Bar Hop
14	Kyle Mendoza	1:17.79	Failed on Bar Hop
15	Jeremiah Morgan	1:20.47	Failed on Bar Hop
16	Dan Polizzi	1:38.67	Failed on Bar Hop
17	Eric Middleton	1:38.93	Failed on Bar Hop
18	Drew Hendry	1:39.12	Failed on Bar Hop
19	Alex Carson	1:47.55	Failed on Bar Hop
20	Mitch VeDepo	1:56.17	Failed on Bar Hop
21	Brad Spine	2:01.01	Failed on Bar Hop
22	Bobby Mohannon	2:11.50	Failed on Bar Hop
23	Wes Whitlam	2:20.51	Failed on Bar Hop
24	Kyle Schulze	2:36.54	Failed on Bar Hop
25	Morgan "Moose" Wright	2:58.82	Failed on Bar Hop
26	Michael Bougher	0:28.36	Failed on Crank It Up
27	Deren Perez	0:30.35	Failed on Crank It Up
28	Donovan Metoyer	0:39.37	Failed on Crank It Up
29	Craig Schafer	0:44.84	Failed on Crank It Up
30	Spencer Johnson	0:53.10	Failed on Crank It Up

Top 5 Women
Rank	Competitor	Time	Furthest Obstacle
1	Sarah Schoback	1:15.25	Failed on Crank It Up
2	Annie Dudek	1:16.40	Failed on Crank It Up
3	Abby Paul	1:30.18	Failed on Crank It Up
4	Maggi Thorne	1:31.58	Failed on Crank It Up
5	Sara Heesen	1:39.55	Failed on Crank It Up

==== Finals ====
The Kansas City Finals round had a new obstacle, the Iron Maiden. The round concluded without any finishers, making it the second time in ANW history that a city finals course was unfinished. Ethan Swanson and the Towers of Power all fell on the third obstacle. Maggi Thorne became the first woman to defeat Crank It Up and earned the "POM Wonderful Run of the Night".

Obstacles used, in addition to those during the Qualifying, for the Kansas City Finals are listed below.

Top 15 Competitors
Rank	Competitor	Time	Furthest Obstacle
1	Mitch VeDepo	4:19.49	Failed on Elevator Climb
2	Tyler Yamauchi	3:44.53	Failed on Iron Maiden
3	Hunter Guerard	2:49.30	Failed on Floating Monkey Bars
4	Eric Middleton	3:22.46	Failed on Floating Monkey Bars
5	Dave Cavanagh	3:33.90	Failed on Floating Monkey Bars
6	Lance Pekus	3:36.52	Failed on Floating Monkey Bars
7	Jeremiah Morgan	4:17.41	Failed on Floating Monkey Bars
8	Jelani Allen	4:17.42	Failed on Floating Monkey Bars
9	Alex Carson	4:34.69	Failed on Floating Monkey Bars
10	Kyle Mendoza	1:17.73	Failed on Salmon Ladder
11	Spencer Johnson	2:56.12	Failed on Salmon Ladder
12	Brad Spine	2:57.20	Failed on Salmon Ladder
13	Ben Baker	2:57.63	Failed on Salmon Ladder
14	Morgan "Moose" Wright	4:17.37	Failed on Salmon Ladder
15	Donovan Metoyer	1:04.60	Failed on Bar Hop

Top 2 Women
Rank	Competitor	Time	Furthest Obstacle
1	Maggi Thorne	2:43.92	Failed on Bar Hop (POM Wonderful Run of the Night)
2	Sara Heesen	1:10.04	Failed on Crank It Up

=== Cleveland ===
==== Qualifying ====
The Cleveland Qualifying featured two new obstacles. Allyssa Beird was the first woman to complete the course this season; she and Jesse Labreck were the first two women to hit the buzzer during the same qualifier. It was also the first time that two couples (Jesse Labreck and Chris DiGangi, and Allyssa Beird and James McGrath) completed the course during the same qualifying run. Jesse Labreck also earned the "POM Wonderful Run of the Night."

Top 30 Competitors
Rank	Competitor	Time	Furthest Obstacle
1	Anthony DeFranco	2:31.17	Finished
2	Joe Moravsky	2:32.77	Finished
3	Sean Noel	2:40.71	Finished
4	Dan Galiczynski	3:13.66	Finished
5	James McGrath	3:22.10	Finished
6	Najee Richardson	3:28.58	Finished
7	Judas Licciardello	3:31.52	Finished
8	Michael Torres	3:44.70	Finished
9	Mike Bernardo	3:47.59	Finished
10	Chris DiGangi	4:01.02	Finished
11	Jamie Rahn	4:13.96	Finished
12	Jesse Labreck	4:22.06	Finished (POM Wonderful Run of the Night)
13	Tyler Cravens	4:27.78	Finished
14	Allyssa Beird	6:20.32	Finished
15	Mathew Ilgenfritz	2:16.36	Failed on Warped Wall
16	Jon Alexis Jr.	1:02.02	Failed on I-Beam Gap
17	Mike Meyers	1:30.28	Failed on I-Beam Gap
18	Cory Cook	1:49.28	Failed on I-Beam Gap
19	Derek Mathews	2:06.33	Failed on I-Beam Gap
20	Naeem Mulkey	2:07.04	Failed on I-Beam Gap
21	Samer Delgado	2:14.53	Failed on I-Beam Gap
22	Mark Ribeiro	2:24.22	Failed on I-Beam Gap
23	Alexi Matousek	2:24.28	Failed on I-Beam Gap
24	Kevin Weng	2:25.22	Failed on I-Beam Gap
25	Patrick Lavanty	2:37.20	Failed on I-Beam Gap
26	Steve Allen	2:41.21	Failed on I-Beam Gap
27	Jonathan Angelilli	2:44.05	Failed on I-Beam Gap
28	Mike Shuck	2:45.66	Failed on I-Beam Gap
29	Fabio Figueiredo	2:56.41	Failed on I-Beam Gap
30	Daniel Arnold	3:05.56	Failed on I-Beam Gap

Top 5 Women
Rank	Competitor	Time	Furthest Obstacle
1	Jesse LaBreck	4:22.06	Finished
2	Allyssa Beird	6:20.32	Finished
3	Tori Clement	1:22.23	Failed on Ring Jump
4	Michelle Warnky	1:28.19	Failed on Ring Jump
5	Annika Nieshalla	1:35.02	Failed on Ring Jump

==== Finals ====
The Cleveland Finals round introduced a new obstacle, the Nail Clipper, which defeated all but two competitors. "Captain NBC" Jamie Rahn was the first to hit the buzzer, earning the "POM Wonderful Run of the Night" with a time of 8:39.85. James McGrath's streak of six Nationals appearances ended when he fell on the dismount from the Nail Clipper, as Joe Moravsky knocked him out of the top 15 and finished the course even faster with a time of 7:24.10. Michelle Warnky made it farther than all but 6 other women in the city finals of ANW 9, making it to the Nail Clipper, but her slow time prevented her from going to Vegas with a talented field of women in Cleveland.

Obstacles used, in addition to those during the qualifiers, for the Cleveland City Finals are listed below.

Top 15 Competitors
Rank	Competitor	Time	Furthest Obstacle
1	Joe Moravsky	7:24.10	Finished
2	Jamie Rahn	8:39.85	Finished (POM Wonderful Run of the Night)
3	Jon Alexis Jr.	2:40.68	Failed on Nail Clipper
4	Mike Meyers	3:35.18	Failed on Nail Clipper
5	Judas Licciardello	3:53.33	Failed on Nail Clipper
6	Michael Torres	3:53.62	Failed on Nail Clipper
7	Dan Galiczynski	3:57.56	Failed on Nail Clipper
8	Mike Bernardo	3:57.97	Failed on Nail Clipper
9	Anthony DeFranco	4:03.32	Failed on Nail Clipper
10	Chris DiGangi	4:18.92	Failed on Nail Clipper
11	Matthew Ilgenfritz	4:38.26	Failed on Nail Clipper
12	Tyler Cravens	4:44.29	Failed on Nail Clipper
13	Najee Richardson	4:52.73	Failed on Nail Clipper
14	Samer Delgado	4:56.13	Failed on Nail Clipper
15	Jesse Labreck	5:03.76	Failed on Nail Clipper

Top 2 Women
Rank	Competitor	Time	Furthest Obstacle
1	Jesse LaBreck	5:03.76	Failed on Nail Clipper
2	Allyssa Beird	6:09.20	Failed on Nail Clipper

=== Denver ===
==== Qualifying ====
The Denver Qualifying featured two new obstacles. The competition concluded with a 2nd to lowest total of only 8 finishers. The fastest run was awarded to gym owner Lorin Ball who earned the "POM Wonderful Run of the Night" with a time of 1:42.89. Also, PBR bull rider Venn Johns competed, but failed on the third obstacle. Jake Murray also competed, but failed on the third obstacle as well.

Top 30 Competitors
Rank	Competitor	Time	Furthest Obstacle
1	Lorin Ball	1:42.89	Finished (POM Wonderful Run of the Night)
2	Dan Yager	1:59.65	Finished
3	Ian Dory	2:47.79	Finished
4	Drew Knapp	2:50.94	Finished
5	Craig Richard	3:17.97	Finished
6	Bart Copeland	3:26.26	Finished
7	Andrew Duncan	3:36.25	Finished
8	Nick Kostreski	3:36.43	Finished
9	Brian Arnold	1:15.15	Failed on Rail Runner
10	Karson Voiles	1:20.21	Failed on Rail Runner
11	Ben Antoine	1:29.90	Failed on Rail Runner
12	Devin Stratton	1:30.78	Failed on Rail Runner
13	Michael Silenzi	1:31.65	Failed on Rail Runner
14	Matt Dolce	1:35.64	Failed on Rail Runner
15	Yancey Quezada	1:39.53	Failed on Rail Runner
16	Michael Stanger	1:41.57	Failed on Rail Runner
17	Ben Burkhalter	1:42.67	Failed on Rail Runner
18	Kyle Wilson	1:43.30	Failed on Rail Runner
19	Jesse Lucero	1:46.12	Failed on Rail Runner
20	Brandon Todacheenie	1:51.36	Failed on Rail Runner
21	Ryan Souter	2:04.71	Failed on Rail Runner
22	Ian Weber	2:05.09	Failed on Rail Runner
23	Meagan Martin	2:17.81	Failed on Rail Runner
24	Jeri D'Aurelio	2:27.83	Failed on Rail Runner
25	Matt Reeves	2:30.37	Failed on Rail Runner
26	Sam Sann	2:37.64	Failed on Rail Runner
27	Luke Chambers	2:40.71	Failed on Rail Runner
28	Tammy McClure	2:53.08	Failed on Rail Runner
29	Dalton Knapp	3:03.62	Failed on Rail Runner
30	Nate DeHaan	3:59.86	Failed on Rail Runner

Top 5 Women
Rank	Competitor	Time	Furthest Obstacle
1	Meagan Martin	2:17.81	Failed on Rail Runner
2	Jeri D'Aurelio	2:27.83	Failed on Rail Runner
3	Tammy McClure	2:53.08	Failed on Rail Runner
4	Larissa Cottle	3:00.15	Failed on Paddle Boards
5	Tanya O'Donohue	0:18.44	Failed on Ring Swing

==== Finals ====
Obstacles used, in addition to those during Qualifying, for the Denver Finals are listed below. Ian Dory continued his city finals completion streak, earning the "POM Wonderful Run of the Night" as the only finisher with a time of 6:56.33. Lorin Ball exhibited all of his upper-body training on the Wedge, and was one of the three people to clear the obstacle.

Top 15 Competitors
Rank	Competitor	Time	Furthest Obstacle
1	Ian Dory	6:56.33	Finished (POM Wonderful Run of the Night)
2	Lorin Ball	3:54.71	Failed on Ninjago Roll
3	Jesse Lucero	4:09.68	Failed on Ninjago Roll
4	Karson Voiles	2:58.62	Failed on The Wedge
5	Ryan Souter	3:03.22	Failed on The Wedge
6	Dan Yager	3:15.07	Failed on The Wedge
7	Craig Richard	3:24.15	Failed on The Wedge
8	Bart Copeland	3:46.84	Failed on The Wedge
9	Drew Knapp	3:51.98	Failed on The Wedge
10	Ben Antoine	4:06.41	Failed on The Wedge
11	Brian Arnold	4:17.08	Failed on The Wedge
12	Yancey Quezada	4:17.22	Failed on The Wedge
13	Luke Chambers	4:18.37	Failed on The Wedge
14	Michael Silenzi	4:33.48	Failed on The Wedge
15	Nick Kostreski	6:03.78	Failed on The Wedge

Top 2 Women
Rank	Competitor	Time	Furthest Obstacle
1	Meagan Martin	6:19.07	Failed on The Wedge
2	Jeri D'Aurelio	2:03.26	Failed on Rail Runner

Note: The competitors of Denver Finals were also given free tickets to the premiere of The Lego Ninjago Movie.

== City Qualifying Leaderboard ==
Top 180 Competitors
Rank	Competitor	Time	Furthest Obstacle
1	Drew Drechsel	1:10.49	Finished
2	Grant McCartney	1:26.37	Finished
3	Adam Rayl	1:29.79	Finished
4	Kevin Bull	1:33.57	Finished
5	Brian Wilczewski	1:37.15	Finished
6	Sean Bryan	1:37.47	Finished
7	Ryan Robinson	1:39.56	Finished
8	Lorin Ball	1:42.89	Finished
9	Daniel Gil	1:43.25	Finished
10	Thomas Stillings	1:45.76	Finished
11	Travis Rosen	1:47.14	Finished
12	Nick Hanson	1:57.82	Finished
13	Flip Rodriguez	1:58.28	Finished
14	Dan Yager	1:59.65	Finished
15	Gabe Hurtado	2:09.93	Finished
16	Lance Pekus	2:10.16	Finished
17	Josh Salinas	2:10.29	Finished
18	Tyler Gillett	2:17.23	Finished
19	Brian Burkhardt	2:20.61	Finished
20	Anthony Trucks	2:20.76	Finished
21	Karsten Williams	2:23.29	Finished
22	Brent Bundy	2:26.47	Finished
23	Casidy Marks	2:26.80	Finished
24	Robin Pietschmann	2:29.81	Finished
25	Tukrong Klengdong	2:30.91	Finished
26	Anthony DeFranco	2:31.17	Finished
27	Jackson Meyer	2:31.24	Finished
28	Joe Moravsky	2:32.77	Finished
29	Nicholas Coolridge	2:33.21	Finished
30	JJ Woods	2:35.07	Finished
31	Kapu Gaison	2:37.24	Finished
32	Josh Levin	2:39.62	Finished
33	Sean Noel	2:40.71	Finished
34	Brandon Mears	2:41.91	Finished
35	Tyler Yamauchi	2:44.49	Finished
36	Brett Sims	2:46.04	Finished
37	Ian Dory	2:47.79	Finished
38	Drew Knapp	2:50.94	Finished
39	Reko Rivera	2:52.38	Finished
40	Tyler Smith	2:54.34	Finished
41	Ethan Swanson	2:54.94	Finished
42	Ryan Stratis	2:55.19	Finished
43	Broc Bebout	2:55.35	Finished
44	Kevin Klein	2:55.51	Finished
45	Grant Clinton	2:56.63	Finished
46	Lucas Gomes	3:00.21	Finished
47	Jody Avila	3:02.59	Finished
48	Riles Nganga	3:02.85	Finished
49	Sean Darling-Hammond	3:05.77	Finished
50	Nick Patel	3:06.38	Finished
51	Dave Cavanagh	3:06.51	Finished
52	Kevin Carbone	3:07.73	Finished
53	Westley Silvestri	3:09.86	Finished
54	Rigel Henry	3:10.79	Finished
55	Andrew Lowes	3:10.98	Finished
56	Dan Galiczynski	3:13.66	Finished
57	Alexio Gomes	3:15.04	Finished
58	Craig Richard	3:17.97	Finished
59	Charlie Andrews	3:19.89	Finished
60	Brent Steffensen	3:20.38	Finished
61	Benjamin Humphrys	3:21.46	Finished
62	James McGrath	3:22.10	Finished
63	Victor Juarez	3:23.68	Finished
64	Sander Odish	3:25.55	Finished
65	Bart Copeland	3:26.26	Finished
66	Najee Richardson	3:28.58	Finished
67	Anton Reichel	3:29.09	Finished
68	Judas Licciardello	3:31.52	Finished
69	Andrew Duncan	3:36.25	Finished
70	Nick Kostreski	3:36.43	Finished
71	Michael Torres	3:44.70	Finished
72	Steve Seiver	3:46.62	Finished
73	Mike Bernardo	3:47.59	Finished
74	Ben Baker	3:53.90	Finished
75	Dustin Fishman	3:55.24	Finished
76	Michael Johnson	3:56.91	Finished
77	Chris DiGangi	4:01.02	Finished
78	Jelani Allen	4:06.31	Finished
79	Dennis Lappin	4:09.10	Finished
80	Abel Gonzalez	4:12.63	Finished
81	Jamie Rahn	4:13.96	Finished
82	Eddy Stewart	4:16.18	Finished
83	Jesse Labreck	4:22.06	Finished
84	Jonathan Horton	4:27.28	Finished
85	Tyler Cravens	4:27.78	Finished
86	Tanr Ross	4:35.91	Finished
87	Jonathan Parr	4:39.09	Finished
88	Allyssa Beird	6:20.32	Finished
89	Mathew Ilgenfritz	2:16.36	Failed on Warped Wall
90	Daniel Moreno	2:38.19	Failed on Warped Wall
91	Zhanique Lovett	3:10.59	Failed on Warped Wall
92	Devin Harrelson	3:20.15	Failed on Warped Wall
93	Tyler Vogt	3:48.15	Failed on Warped Wall
94	Todd Mitchell	4:37.09	Failed on Warped Wall
95	Alan Connealy	0:41.10	Failed on Battering Ram
96	David Campbell	0:51.93	Failed on Battering Ram
97	Scott Willson	0:55.92	Failed on Battering Ram
98	Jon Alexis Jr.	1:02.02	Failed on I-Beam Gap
99	Hunter Guerard	1:04.13	Failed on Bar Hop
100	Les Bradley	1:10.57	Failed on Rolling Thunder
101	Brian Arnold	1:15.15	Failed on Rail Runner
102	Kyle Mendoza	1:17.79	Failed on Bar Hop
103	Karson Voiles	1:20.21	Failed on Rail Runner
104	Jeremiah Morgan	1:20.47	Failed on Bar Hop
105	Michael Murdick	1:27.26	Failed on Rolling Thunder
106	Ben Antoine	1:29.90	Failed on Rail Runner
107	Mike Meyers	1:30.28	Failed on I-Beam Gap
108	Devin Stratton	1:30.78	Failed on Rail Runner
109	Will Smithee	1:31.49	Failed on Pipefitter
110	Michael Silenzi	1:31.65	Failed on Rail Runner
111	Kye Ackel	1:32.05	Failed on Pipefitter
112	Steven Cen	1:32.99	Failed on Rolling Thunder
113	K.C. Halik	1:33.18	Failed on Battering Ram
114	David Yarter	1:34.29	Failed on Pipefitter
115	Tiana Webberley	1:35.04	Failed on Battering Ram
116	Bootie Cothran	1:35.58	Failed on Rolling Thunder
117	Matt Dolce	1:35.64	Failed on Rail Runner
118	Faris Xero	1:36.00	Failed on Rolling Thunder
119	Dan Polizzi	1:38.67	Failed on Bar Hop
120	Eric Middleton	1:38.93	Failed on Bar Hop
121	Drew Hendry	1:39.12	Failed on Bar Hop
122	Yancey Quezada	1:39.53	Failed on Rail Runner
123	Michael Stanger	1:41.57	Failed on Rail Runner
124	Ben Burkhalter	1:42.67	Failed on Rail Runner
125	Cass Clawson	1:42.71	Failed on Pipefitter
126	Kyle Wilson	1:43.30	Failed on Rail Runner
127	Cedric Idudu	1:43.45	Failed on Rolling Thunder
128	Kenny Niemitalo	1:43.57	Failed on Pipefitter
129	Oscar Ramirez	1:45.89	Failed on Rolling Thunder
130	Jesse Lucero	1:46.12	Failed on Rail Runner
131	Jessie Graff	1:46.80	Failed on Rolling Thunder
132	Nate Burkhalter	1:47.51	Failed on Pipefitter
133	Alex Carson	1:47.55	Failed on Bar Hop
134	Blake Devine	1:47.79	Failed on Pipefitter
135	Cory Cook	1:49.28	Failed on I-Beam Gap
136	Brandon Pannell	1:50.86	Failed on Pipefitter
137	Matt Holt	1:50.90	Failed on Pipefitter
138	Brandon Todacheenie	1:51.36	Failed on Rail Runner
139	Damir Okanovic	1:52.29	Failed on Pipefitter
140	Mitch VeDepo	1:56.17	Failed on Bar Hop
141	Brad Spine	2:01.01	Failed on Bar Hop
142	Tremayne Dortch	2:01.47	Failed on Pipefitter
143	Ricky Vu	2:01.47	Failed on Rolling Thunder
144	Ryan Souter	2:04.71	Failed on Rail Runner
145	Ian Weber	2:05.09	Failed on Rail Runner
146	Derek Mathews	2:06.33	Failed on I-Beam Gap
147	Naeem Mulkey	2:07.04	Failed on I-Beam Gap
148	Bobby Mohannon	2:11.50	Failed on Bar Hop
149	Sam Ballard	2:13.90	Failed on Pipefitter
150	Josh Butler	2:13.90	Failed on Rolling Thunder
151	Samer Delgado	2:14.53	Failed on I-Beam Gap
152	Meagan Martin	2:17.81	Failed on Rail Runner
153	Wes Whitlam	2:20.51	Failed on Bar Hop
154	Mark Ribeiro	2:24.22	Failed on I-Beam Gap
155	Alexi Matousek	2:24.28	Failed on I-Beam Gap
156	Kevin Weng	2:25.22	Failed on I-Beam Gap
157	Jeri D'Aurelio	2:27.83	Failed on Rail Runner
158	Jared Bandy	2:28.24	Failed on Pipefitter
159	Royall Eason	2:28.24	Failed on Rolling Thunder
160	Matt Reeves	2:30.37	Failed on Rail Runner
161	Kyle Schulze	2:36.54	Failed on Bar Hop
162	Patrick Lavanty	2:37.20	Failed on I-Beam Gap
163	Sam Sann	2:37.64	Failed on Rail Runner
164	Luke Chambers	2:40.71	Failed on Rail Runner
165	Steve Allen	2:41.21	Failed on I-Beam Gap
166	Jonathan Angelilli	2:44.05	Failed on I-Beam Gap
167	Mike Shuck	2:45.66	Failed on I-Beam Gap
168	Tammy McClure	2:53.08	Failed on Rail Runner
169	Fabio Figueiredo	2:56.41	Failed on I-Beam Gap
170	Morgan "Moose" Wright	2:58.82	Failed on Bar Hop
171	Dalton Knapp	3:03.62	Failed on Rail Runner
172	Daniel Arnold	3:05.56	Failed on I-Beam Gap
173	Barclay Stockett	3:29.71	Failed on Pipefitter
174	Jonathan Lorch	3:29.71	Failed on Rolling Thunder
175	Nate DeHaan	3:59.86	Failed on Rail Runner
176	Michael Bougher	0:28.36	Failed on Crank It Up
177	Deren Perez	0:30.35	Failed on Crank It Up
178	Donovan Metoyer	0:39.37	Failed on Crank It Up
179	Craig Schafer	0:44.84	Failed on Crank It Up
180	Spencer Johnson	0:53.10	Failed on Crank It Up

Top 30 Women
Rank	Competitor	Time	Furthest Obstacle
1	Jesse Labreck	4:22.06	Finished
2	Allyssa Beird	6:20.32	Finished
3	Zhanique Lovett	3:10.59	Failed on Warped Wall
4	Tiana Webberley	1:35.04	Failed on Battering Ram
5	April Steiner Bennett	1:43.51	Failed on Battering Ram
6	Jessie Graff	1:46.80	Failed on Rolling Thunder
7	Rebekah Bonilla	2:05.65	Failed on Battering Ram
8	Meagan Martin	2:17.81	Failed on Rail Runner
9	Natalie Duran	2:20.17	Failed on Battering Ram
10	Lindsay Eskildsen	2:21.13	Failed on Rolling Thunder
11	Jeri D'Aurelio	2:27.83	Failed on Rail Runner
12	Tammy McClure	2:53.08	Failed on Rail Runner
13	Bree Widener	2:53.67	Failed on Rolling Thunder
14	Barclay Stockett	3:29.71	Failed on Pipefitter
15	Sarah Schoback	1:15.25	Failed on Crank It Up
16	Annie Dudek	1:16.40	Failed on Crank It Up
17	Tori Clement	1:22.23	Failed on Ring Jump
18	Michelle Warnky	1:28.19	Failed on Ring Jump
19	Abby Paul	1:30.18	Failed on Crank It Up
20	Maggi Thorne	1:31.58	Failed on Crank It Up
21	Annika Nieshalla	1:35.02	Failed on Ring Jump
22	Sara Heesen	1:39.55	Failed on Crank It Up
23	Kacy Catanzaro	1:52.88	Failed on Sky Hooks
24	Larissa Cottle	3:00.15	Failed on Paddle Boards
25	Emily Durham	0:31.54	Failed on Wingnuts
26	Adriane Alvord	0:51.59	Failed on Wingnuts
27	Sherrie Laureano	1:14.24	Failed on Spinning Bridge
28	Kaiti Haymaker	1:20.76	Failed on Spinning Bridge
29	Brittany Hanks	0:16.65	Failed on Tic Toc
30	Tanya O’Donohue	0:18.44	Failed on Ring Swing

== City Finals Leaderboard ==
Top 90 Competitors
Rank	Competitor	Time	Furthest Obstacle
1	Sean Bryan	5:07.22	Finished
2	Adam Rayl	5:07.92	Finished
3	Daniel Gil	5:50.65	Finished
4	Charlie Andrews	6:02.21	Finished
5	Josh Levin	6:27.98	Finished
6	Ian Dory	6:56.33	Finished
7	Joe Moravsky	7:24.10	Finished
8	Drew Drechsel	7:34.60	Finished
9	Jamie Rahn	8:39.85	Finished
10	Mitch VeDepo	4:19.49	Failed on Elevator Climb
11	Thomas Stillings	4:29.25	Failed on Elevator Climb
12	Flip Rodriguez	4:49.73	Failed on Elevator Climb
13	Nicholas Coolridge	5:07.15	Failed on Elevator Climb
14	Brent Steffensen	5:12.38	Failed on Elevator Climb
15	Gabe Hurtado	5:50.71	Failed on Elevator Climb
16	JJ Woods	6:20.96	Failed on Elevator Climb
17	Sean Darling-Hammond	6:26.03	Failed on Elevator Climb
18	Jessie Graff	7:04.29	Failed on Elevator Climb
19	Brian Wilczewski	2:31.21	Failed on Stair Hopper
20	Karsten Williams	2:39.43	Failed on Spinball Wizard
21	Kevin Bull	3:02.40	Failed on Stair Hopper
22	Travis Rosen	3:41.07	Failed on Circuit Board
23	Tyler Yamauchi	3:44.58	Failed on Iron Maiden
24	Casidy Marks	3:47.40	Failed on Circuit Board
25	Tyler Gillett	3:47.60	Failed on Circuit Board
26	Andrew Lowes	3:54.62	Failed on Spinball Wizard
27	Lorin Ball	3:54.71	Failed on Ninjago Roll
28	Jesse Lucero	4:09.68	Failed on Ninjago Roll
29	Robin Pietschmann	4:22.90	Failed on Stair Hopper
30	Kevin Carbone	4:51.35	Failed on Circuit Board
31	Jackson Meyer	5:03.54	Failed on Stair Hopper
32	Josh Salinas	2:29.64	Failed on Hourglass Drop
33	Jon Alexis Jr.	2:40.68	Failed on Nail Clipper
34	Rigel Henry	2:47.71	Failed on Giant Cubes
35	Hunter Guerard	2:49.30	Failed on Floating Monkey Bars
36	Brian Burkhardt	2:55.84	Failed on Hourglass Drop
37	Karson Voiles	2:58.62	Failed on The Wedge
38	Damir Okanovic	3:02.90	Failed on Hourglass Drop
39	Kapu Gaison	3:03.15	Failed on Swinging Peg Board
40	Ryan Souter	3:03.22	Failed on The Wedge
41	Steve Seiver	3:10.34	Failed on Swinging Peg Board
42	Dan Yager	3:15.07	Failed on The Wedge
43	Benjamin Humphrys	3:15.66	Failed on Swinging Peg Board
44	Matt Holt	3:19.13	Failed on Hourglass Drop
45	Eric Middleton	3:22.46	Failed on Floating Monkey Bars
46	Nick Hanson	3:22.56	Failed on Swinging Peg Board
47	Craig Richard	3:24.15	Failed on The Wedge
48	Grant Clinton	3:25.56	Failed on Hourglass Drop
49	Abel Gonzalez	3:25.98	Failed on Hourglass Drop
50	Brandon Pannell	3:29.05	Failed on Hourglass Drop
51	David Campbell	3:29.48	Failed on Swinging Peg Board
52	Cass Clawson	3:31.83	Failed on Hourglass Drop
53	Jody Avila	3:32.66	Failed on Hourglass Drop
54	Dave Cavanagh	3:33.90	Failed on Floating Monkey Bars
55	Mike Meyers	3:35.18	Failed on Nail Clipper
56	Lance Pekus	3:36.52	Failed on Floating Monkey Bars
57	Nick Patel	3:44.59	Failed on Giant Cubes
58	Bart Copeland	3:46.84	Failed on The Wedge
59	Drew Knapp	3:51.98	Failed on The Wedge
60	Lucas Gomes	3:52.87	Failed on Giant Cubes
61	Reko Rivera	3:53.30	Failed on Giant Cubes
62	Judas Licciardello	3:53.33	Failed on Nail Clipper
63	Michael Torres	3:53.62	Failed on Nail Clipper
64	Dan Galiczynski	3:57.56	Failed on Nail Clipper
65	Mike Bernardo	3:57.97	Failed on Nail Clipper
66	Ryan Stratis	3:58.95	Failed on Giant Cubes
67	Dustin Fishman	4:00.02	Failed on Giant Cubes
68	Anthony DeFranco	4:03.32	Failed on Nail Clipper
69	Ben Antoine	4:06.41	Failed on The Wedge
70	Michael Johnson	4:08.65	Failed on Giant Cubes
71	Brian Arnold	4:17.08	Failed on The Wedge
72	Yancey Quezada	4:17.22	Failed on The Wedge
73	Jeremiah Morgan	4:17.41	Failed on Floating Monkey Bars
74	Jelani Allen	4:17.42	Failed on Floating Monkey Bars
75	Luke Chambers	4:18.37	Failed on The Wedge
76	Chris DiGangi	4:18.92	Failed on Nail Clipper
77	Michael Silenzi	4:33.48	Failed on The Wedge
78	Alex Carson	4:34.69	Failed on Floating Monkey Bars
79	Matthew Ilgenfritz	4:38.26	Failed on Nail Clipper
80	Tyler Cravens	4:44.29	Failed on Nail Clipper
81	Najee Richardson	4:52.73	Failed on Nail Clipper
82	Samer Delgado	4:56.13	Failed on Nail Clipper
83	Jesse Labreck	5:03.76	Failed on Nail Clipper
84	Nick Kostreski	6:03.78	Failed on The Wedge
85	Kyle Mendoza	1:17.73	Failed on Salmon Ladder
86	Spencer Johnson	2:56.12	Failed on Salmon Ladder
87	Brad Spine	2:57.20	Failed on Salmon Ladder
88	Ben Baker	2:57.63	Failed on Salmon Ladder
89	Morgan "Moose" Wright	4:17.37	Failed on Salmon Ladder
90	Donovan Metoyer	1:04.60	Failed on Bar Hop

Top 12 Women
Rank	Competitor	Time	Furthest Obstacle
1	Jessie Graff	7:04.29	Failed on Elevator Climb
2	Jesse Labreck	5:03.76	Failed on Nail Clipper
3	Rebekah Bonilla	5:26.32	Failed on Swinging Peg Board
4	Barclay Stockett	5:43.62	Failed on Hourglass Drop
5	Allyssa Beird	6:09.20	Failed on Nail Clipper
6	Meagan Martin	6:19.07	Failed on The Wedge
7	Zhanique Lovett	3:14.80	Failed on Warped Wall
8	Kacy Catanzaro	4:18.32	Failed on Warped Wall
9	Lindsay Eskildsen	1:39.58	Failed on Rolling Thunder
10	Jeri D'Aurelio	2:03.26	Failed on Rail Runner
11	Maggi Thorne	2:43.92	Failed on Bar Hop
12	Sara Heesen	1:10.04	Failed on Crank It Up

== National Finals ==
The National Finals were held along the Las Vegas Strip, as has been the case since the series set up its own finals course instead of sending competitors to Japan.

=== Stage 1 ===
All competitors must complete the eight obstacles on Stage 1 with a time limit of 2:35.00. Highlights from the first half included school teacher Allyssa Beird who made ANW history by becoming only the second woman (also the third worldwide, the first two being Chie Tanabe in Sasuke 2 and Jessie Graff in the eighth season of ANW) to complete Stage One, earning her the POM Wonderful "Run of the Night". Also, at only 5 feet tall, gymnastics coach Barclay Stockett became the second woman to get past the Warped Wall on Stage One. Later, NBC Sports announcer Mike Tirico joined ANW announcers Matt Iseman and Akbar Gbajabiamila for a few play-by-plays of the competitors. During the second half, "Real Life Ninja" Drew Drechsel earned the POM Wonderful "Run of the Night" with the fastest run on Stage One of the competition with a speedy time of 1:33.71. David Campbell's Stage 1 fail streak was over as he finished the course for the first time since Season 3. This season broke the previous record of most Stage 1 finishers with 41, beating the previous record of 38 from Season 7. Also, this was Kacy Catanzaro's final ANW appearance, as she failed on the Double Dipper. She signed with WWE in late August and the company's NXT brand in early 2018. She has since found success there, winning the NXT Women's Tag Team Championship and the WWE Women's Tag Team Championship with Kayden Carter in August 2022 and December 2023, respectively, and having the longest reign in the former championship's history at 186 days.

Stage 1 featured three new obstacles, the Double Dipper, Parkour Run, and the Domino Pipes.

Competitors who completed Stage 1 are listed below. △ denotes female competitors.

Order	Competitor	Outcome	Result
1	Drew Drechsel	Finished	1:33.71 (POM Wonderful Run of the Night, Night 2)
2	Josh Salinas	Finished	1:38.54
3	Daniel Gil	Finished	1:47.04
4	Lance Pekus	Finished	1:49.52
5	Hunter Guerard	Finished	1:51.16
6	Joe Moravsky	Finished	1:52.24
7	Dave Cavanagh	Finished	1:56.76
8	Nicholas Coolridge	Finished	1:58.18
9	Jamie Rahn	Finished	1:59.77
10	Brent Steffensen	Finished	2:01.34
11	Thomas Stillings	Finished	2:02.12
12	Matthew Ilgenfritz	Finished	2:03.48
13	Flip Rodriguez	Finished	2:04.34
14	Travis Rosen	Finished	2:06.20
15	Kevin Bull	Finished	2:07.05
16	Najee Richardson	Finished	2:07.79
17	Jody Avila	Finished	2:08.18
18	Tyler Yamauchi	Finished	2:09.53
19	Mike Bernardo	Finished	2:10.10
20	Eric Middleton	Finished	2:11.48
21	Cass Clawson	Finished	2:12.32
22	David Campbell	Finished	2:14.30
23	Adam Rayl	Finished	2:14.60
24	Brian Arnold	Finished	2:15.15
25	Sean Bryan	Finished	2:15.20
26	Michael Silenzi	Finished	2:15.56
27	Tyler Gillett	Finished	2:16.64
28	Nick Kostreski	Finished	2:17.28
29	Abel Gonzalez	Finished	2:17.60
30	JJ Woods	Finished	2:18.27
31	Jon Alexis Jr.	Finished	2:19.40
32	Josh Levin	Finished	2:20.70
33	Karson Voiles	Finished	2:21.10
34	Ryan Stratis	Finished	2:25.34
35	Drew Knapp	Finished	2:26.14
36	Allyssa Beird △	Finished	2:26.52 (POM Wonderful Run of the Night, Night 1)
37	Ian Dory	Finished	2:27.66
38	Andrew Lowes	Finished	2:28.32
39	Grant Clinton	Finished	2:28.52
40	Sean Darling-Hammond	Finished	2:28.74
41	Nick Hanson	Finished	2:29.97

=== Stage 2 ===
As always in the national finals, Stage 2 consists of six obstacles. In order to move on to Stage 3, competitors must finish the Stage 2 course in under 4:00.00.

Stage 2 featured three new obstacles, the Criss Cross Salmon Ladder, the Swing Surfer, and Wingnut Alley.

Results:

Run Order	Competitor	Result	Notes
1	Ian Dory	4. Swing Surfer	Failed jump.
2	Lance Pekus	5. Wingnut Alley	Transition to second wingnut
3	Tyler Yamauchi	5. Wingnut Alley	Digest. Transition to second wingnut
4	Brent Steffensen	3. Wave Runner	First board
5	Nick Kostreski	3. Wave Runner	Digest. First board
6	Eric Middleton	3. Wave Runner	Digest. Second board
7	Hunter Guerard	5. Wingnut Alley	Digest. Transition to second wingnut
8	Ryan Stratis	1. Giant Ring Swing	Digest.
9	Tyler Gillett	3. Wave Runner	Digest.
10	Travis Rosen	5. Wingnut Alley	Digest. Transition to third wingnut
11	Jamie Rahn	5. Wingnut Alley	Failed dismount
12	Nick Hanson	2. Criss Cross Salmon Ladder	Digest.
13	Sean Darling-Hammond	5. Wingnut Alley	Digest. Transition to second wingnut
14	Jon Alexis Jr.	5. Wingnut Alley	Digest. Transition to second wingnut
15	Sean Bryan	FINISH (15.06 seconds left)	First to clear Stage 2.
16	Mike Bernardo	4. Swing Surfer	Digest. Failed jump
17	Drew Knapp	5. Wingnut Alley	Digest. Transition to third wingnut
18	Abel Gonzalez	5. Wingnut Alley	Digest. Transition to third wingnut
19	Adam Rayl	5. Wingnut Alley	Failed dismount.
20	Josh Salinas	5. Wingnut Alley	Digest. Transition to third wingnut
21	Jody Avila	5. Wingnut Alley	Digest. Transition to third wingnut
22	Andrew Lowes	5. Wingnut Alley	Digest, Transition to second wingnut
23	Brian Arnold	5. Wingnut Alley	Digest. Transition to third wingnut
24	Najee Richardson	FINISH (20.29 seconds left)	POM Wonderful Run of the Night
25	Josh Levin	3. Wave Runner	Digest.
26	Daniel Gil	5. Wingnut Alley	Failed dismount.
27	Allyssa Beird	2. Criss Cross Salmon Ladder	
28	Dave Cavanagh	3. Wave Runner	Digest.
29	Grant Clinton	5. Wingnut Alley	Digest. Transition to second wingnut
30	Karson Voiles	5. Wingnut Alley	Digest. Transition to second wingnut.
31	Flip Rodriguez	5. Wingnut Alley	Digest. Failed dismount.
32	Joe Moravsky	FINISH (25.66 seconds left)	Fastest Stage 2 clear.
33	Nicholas Coolridge	2. Criss Cross Salmon Ladder	Digest.
34	David Campbell	5. Wingnut Alley	Digest. Transition to third wingnut.
35	Thomas Stillings	5. Wingnut Alley	Digest. Transition to second wingnut.
36	Drew Drechsel	5. Wingnut Alley	Failed dismount.
37	Michael Silenzi	1. Giant Ring Swing	All cut.
38	Cass Clawson	3. Wave Runner	All cut.
39	Matthew Ilgenfritz	5. Wingnut Alley	All cut.
40	J.J. Woods	5. Wingnut Alley	All cut. Transition to second wingnut.
41	Kevin Bull	5. Wingnut Alley	All cut. Transition to second wingnut.

==== Leaderboard ====
Order	Competitor	Outcome	Result
1	Joe Moravsky	Finished	3:34.34
2	Najee Richardson	Finished	3:39.71
3	Sean Bryan	Finished	3:44.94

=== Stage 3 ===
Stage 3 featured three new obstacles, the Nail Clipper (from the Cleveland Finals), the Peg Cloud, and the Time Bomb.

Results:

Run Order	Competitor	Result	Notes
1	Sean Bryan	4. Ultimate Cliffhanger	Transition to fourth ledge
2	Najee Richardson	4. Ultimate Cliffhanger	Transition to second hanging board
3	Joe Moravsky	7. Time Bomb	Last Man Standing

== Ratings ==
=== U.S. Nielsen ratings ===
Show	Episode	Air date	Timeslot	Rating/Share (18–49)		Viewers (millions)
1	"Los Angeles Qualifiers"	June 12, 2017	Monday 8:00 PM	1.4	5	5.36
2	"San Antonio Qualifiers"	June 19, 2017	Monday 8:00 PM	1.5	6	5.85
3	"Daytona Beach Qualifiers"	June 26, 2017	Monday 8:00 PM	1.5	6	5.91
4	"Kansas City Qualifiers"	July 3, 2017	Monday 8:00 PM	1.1	5	5.09
5	"Cleveland Qualifiers"	July 10, 2017	Monday 8:00 PM	1.4	6	5.70
6	"Denver Qualifiers"	July 17, 2017	Monday 8:00 PM	1.5	6	5.78
7	"Los Angeles City Finals"	July 24, 2017	Monday 8:00 PM	1.4	6	5.70
8	"San Antonio Finals"	July 31, 2017	Monday 8:00 PM	1.4	6	5.88
9	"Daytona Beach Finals"	August 7, 2017	Monday 8:00 PM	1.5	6	6.20
10	"Cleveland Finals"	August 14, 2017	Monday 8:00 PM	1.4	5	5.90
11	"Kansas City Finals"	August 21, 2017	Monday 8:00 PM	1.3	5	5.71
12	"Denver City Finals"	August 28, 2017	Monday 8:00 PM	1.5	6	6.47
13	"Las Vegas Finals Night 1"	September 4, 2017	Monday 8:00 PM	1.5	6	6.29
14	"Las Vegas Finals Night 2"	September 11, 2017	Monday 8:00 PM	1.6	6	6.13
15	"Las Vegas Finals Night 3"	September 18, 2017	Monday 8:00 PM	1.5	6	5.96
