= Andrew Wheating =

American middle-distance runner

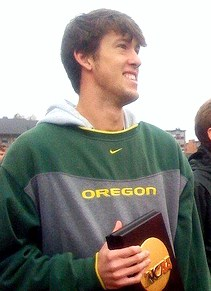

Personal information
- Nationality: American
- Born: November 21, 1987 (age 38) Norwich, Vermont, U.S.
- Height: 1.95 m (6 ft 5 in)
- Weight: 79.3 kg (175 lb)

Sport
- Sport: Running
- Events: 800 metres, 1500 metres
- Club: Oregon Track Club Elite
- Coached by: Mark Rowland

Achievements and titles
- Personal bests: 800 m: 1:44.56; 1500 m: 3:30.90
Medal record
Men's athletics
Representing the United States
Pan American Games
Gold medal – first place	2015 Toronto	1500 m
NACAC Championships
Gold medal – first place	2015 Costa Rica	1500 m

Andrew "Andy" Wheating (born November 21, 1987) is an American retired middle-distance runner. Wheating competed for the United States in the men's 800 m at the 2008 Summer Olympics in Beijing, China, and in the 1500 m at the 2012 Summer Olympics. He was a professional runner for Nike.

== Personal ==
Wheating was born in 1987 in Norwich, Vermont, the son of Justin and Betsy Wheating. His father, born in South Africa, was a field hockey player.

== High school ==
Wheating originally played soccer in high school. He ran two seasons of cross country and one season of track during his stay at Kimball Union Academy. During his first season of track in his senior year, he burst onto the track scene, ranking fourth nationally with a time of 3:54.28 in the 1500 m. He led the nation with a 14:55.28 indoor 5000 m time. His school coach was Buzz Morrison. Wheating became one of the four incoming freshmen at the University of Oregon that ranked top ten nationally in the 1500 m.

== College career ==
Wheating attended the University of Oregon in Eugene; his major was sociology. During his first year of track during the 2006–2007 season, Wheating ran the 800 m for the first time, and led the Ducks in the 800 with a time of 1:50.17. He got points in Pac-10 competition and was part of three relays that were all top five in school history. In addition, he was ranked seventh nationally in the 1500 metres with a time of 3:45.17. Wheating skipped his freshman year of cross country, making 2007 his first season. He was on the All-Pac-10 Second Team for finishing top fourteen in league competition.

During his second season of track in his sophomore year, Wheating became one of the leaders in both the 800 and 1500 nationally. He won eleven straight races in the 800 m races before losing by .01s to Jacob Hernandez in the NCAA Division I national championship. He also excelled in the 1500, clocking a time of 3:38.60, good enough for sixth all time on the University of Oregon list. His time in the 1500 was an NCAA best in 2008, but chose to compete in the 800 instead in both NCAA Nationals and the Olympic Trials. His time of 1:45.03 at the Olympic Trials was good for second on the all-time Univ. of Oregon 800 metres list. He was the NCAA champion in the 800 in both 2009 and 2010. In winning the 1500 at the 2010 NCAA championship he became the first Division I man to win both the 800 and 1500 in the same season since fellow Duck Joaquim Cruz in 1984.

== 2008 Olympic Trials & Games ==
At the 2008 Olympic Trials, Wheating ran a personal best time of 1:45.03, finishing in second place behind Nick Symmonds and earning a spot on the US Olympic Team. His somewhat unexpected qualification was the middle of the Oregon Sweep. In Beijing, he finished fourth in his qualifying heat and failed to advance to the semifinals.

== Professional ==
On July 16, 2010, Wheating improved on his personal best in the 800 m with a time of 1:44.62. Six days later, on July 22, Wheating improved on his personal best in the 1500 m with a time of 3:30.90. That was nearly seven seconds better than his previous best and the fourth-best mark in U.S. history.

At the 2011 World Outdoor Track and Field Championships in Daegu, Wheating finished 8th in his 1500m heat by running a 3:42.68. Wheating placed fourth in 3:48.19 at the 1500 meters at 2011 USA Outdoor Track and Field Championships.

In 2012, Wheating made his 2nd Olympic team by placing 3rd at the USA Trials. He made it through the quarterfinals, but failed to qualify to the finals by placing 9th and running a 3:44.88 in his Semi-Final Heat.

In 2013 Wheating failed to qualify for the IAAF World Championships in Moscow, Russia by placing 12th at the 2013 USA Outdoor Track and Field Championships, running a 4:01.55.

At the 2015 2015 USA Outdoor Track and Field Championships Wheating placed 5th in 3:39.47 to qualify for Pan Am 1500m and NACAC 1500m in Costa Rica where Andrew won gold medals for the United States in the 2015 Pan Am 1500m and NACAC 1500m.

Andrew partnered with Alexi Pappas to make short films for The New York Times. Andrew Wheating placed 11th in 1500 meters at 2016 United States Olympic Trials (track and field) in 3:41.22.

== Personal bests ==
Event	Time	Venue	Date
800 m (outdoor)	1:44.56	London	August 13, 2010
1500 m (outdoor)	3:30.90	Fontvieille	July 22, 2010
800 m (indoor)	1:48.04	Portland, Oregon	February 5, 2016
1000 m (indoor)	2:18.68	Boston	February 14, 2016
Mile run (outdoor)	3:51.74	Eugene	March 13, 2010
Mile run (indoor)	3:58.20	Seattle	February 27, 2010

== Retirement ==
Andrew announced his retirement from Pro-Running on January 4, 2018; he was 30 years old.
