= Oregon Sweep =

The Oregon Sweep was the result of the 2008 United States Olympic Trials Men's 800 metres race.

The Olympic Trials were held at Hayward Field on the University of Oregon campus in Eugene, Oregon. The city of Eugene bills itself as "Tracktown USA" for its fanatical support of the sport of track and field. The 800 metres event was once a strong event for Americans, with 7 Olympic gold medals up to 1956. Between 1956 and 2008, the United States has only managed Dave Wottle's 1972 gold medal, and four bronze medals by Tom Farrell in 1968, Rick Wohlhuter in 1976, Earl Jones in 1984 and Johnny Gray in 1992, increasing the value of success at the Olympic Trials. Eight years later, Clayton Murphy also won a bronze medal.

== The favorites ==
Going into the trials, Khadevis Robinson had won three straight outdoor National Championships and was the reigning Indoor Champion as well. The local favorite was Nick Symmonds, who had been successful at nearby Willamette University, an NCAA Division III school. He had won the 2007 indoor championship but accentuated his rise to the elite level before the home crowd at the Prefontaine Classic when he beat reigning Olympic champion Yuriy Borzakovskiy at his own game coming from behind on the home stretch. Both Robinson and Symmonds won their semi-final heats while former three time national champion David Krummenacker had been eliminated.

The rest of the field included 2004 Olympian Jonathan Johnson, Jebreh Harris, returning from the 2004 Olympic Trials, Lopez Lomong, who had won the previous NCAA Championships, Duane Solomon, from USC, and Andrew Wheating, from the home team of the University of Oregon were up and coming collegiate runners. Symmonds' unheralded Oregon Track Club training partner Christian Smith, formerly from Kansas State University, joined Lomong in edging out an additional college star Jacob Hernandez from the University of Texas in their semi-final. Four other OTC training partners were eliminated in those semi-finals.

== The race ==
To form, there was a battle at the front, as Khadevis Robinson, trained by Johnny Gray, and Jonathan Johnson took the race out fast (24.1 and 50.3), with the rest of the field in a tight pack. Nick Symmonds was at the back of the pack with Andrew Wheating trailing the field. With 200 metres to go (1:17.2) Robinson had a clear lead over Lomong, Solomon and Smith, Symmonds was boxed at the back of the pack with Wheating still trailing. Clipping arms with the slowing Johnson to his outside, Symmonds managed to break free. Running around the outside of the field in the turn, Symmonds charged into the lead at the beginning of the home stretch and powered away to victory. The tall Wheating pulled out to lane 4 to avoid the traffic and followed, passing the faltering Robinson 20 meters before the finish securing the second qualifying position. Across the middle of the track, Smith, Robinson, Lomong and Solomon were all straining for the last qualifying position, with both Smith and Robinson diving for the line landing in a heap. The photo finish declared Smith the third qualifier giving the three Oregon based runners the three positions on the team. The crowd went berserk as much because the sweep by the three athletes who train on the same track was so unexpected. Symmonds was even surprised his partner had qualified and rushed to congratulate him as Smith got back to his feet. The three took a victory lap of the stadium. Smith had not previously made the Olympic A-standard, but achieved it in this race, perhaps the peak of his career.

== Coverage ==
NBC had the TV rights to the Trials and the Olympics. It repeated the thrilling race many times during their coverage of both. Copyrighted copies of the broadcast are all over the internet. The race was called the "defining moment" of the trials by Running Times. Others called it "a race for the ages".
