= Bobby Smith (javelin thrower) =

American javelin thrower (born 1982)

Bobby Smith (born June 24, 1982) is an American former javelin thrower. He won at the 2008 United States Olympic Trials with his personal best of 76.06 m, but was not selected, because he did not achieve the Olympic "A" standard.

Smith competed for the Monmouth Hawks track and field team in the NCAA.
