= Athletics at the 2007 Pan American Games – Women's pole vault =

Women's pole vault at the Pan American Games
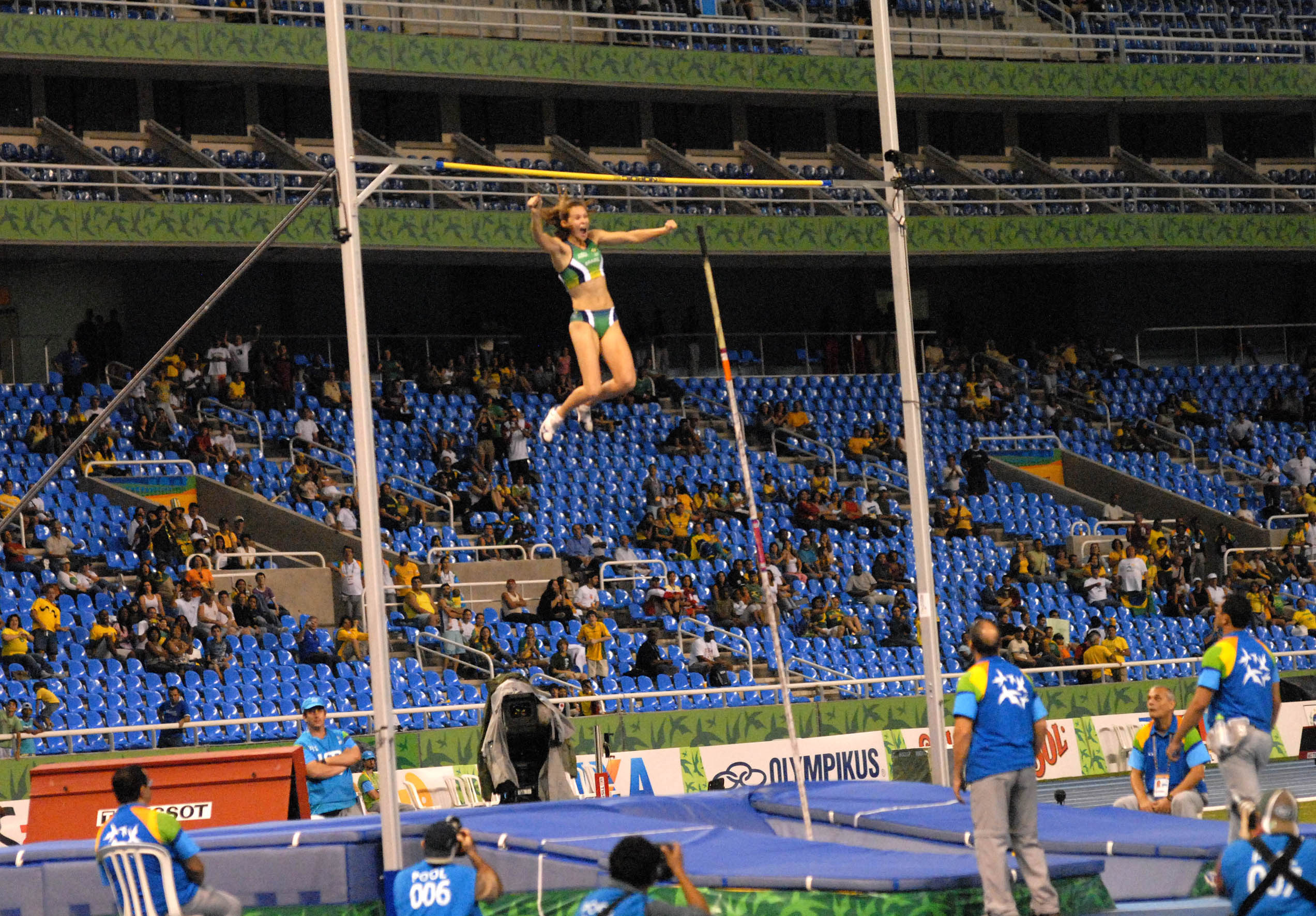
- Murer on her way to her winning height.

The women's pole vault event at the 2007 Pan American Games was held on July 23.

== Results ==
Rank	Athlete	Nationality	3.45	3.60	3.75	3.90	4.00	4.10	4.20	4.30	4.35	4.40	4.50	4.55	4.60	4.68	Result	Notes
1st place, gold medalist(s)	Fabiana Murer	Brazil	–	–	–	–	–	–	–	o	–	o	xo	–	xxo	xxx	4.60	GR
2nd place, silver medalist(s)	April Steiner	United States	–	–	–	–	–	–	–	xxo	xxo	–	xx–	x			4.40	
3rd place, bronze medalist(s)	Yarisley Silva	Cuba	–	–	–	–	–	xo	xo	o	xxx						4.30	PB
4	Alejandra García	Argentina	–	–	–	–	o	o	o	xxx							4.20	
5	Joana Costa	Brazil	–	–	–	o	o	xxo	xo	xxx							4.20	
6	Carolina Torres	Chile	–	–	–	o	xo	xxx									4.00	SB
7	Déborah Gyurcsek	Uruguay	–	–	xxo	xxx											3.75	
8	María Ferrand	Peru	o	xxx													3.45	
	Dana Ellis	Canada	–	–	–	–	–	–	xxx								NM	
	Keisa Monterola	Venezuela	–	–	–	–	xxx										NM	
