= Khadevis Robinson =

American middle distance runner (born 1976)

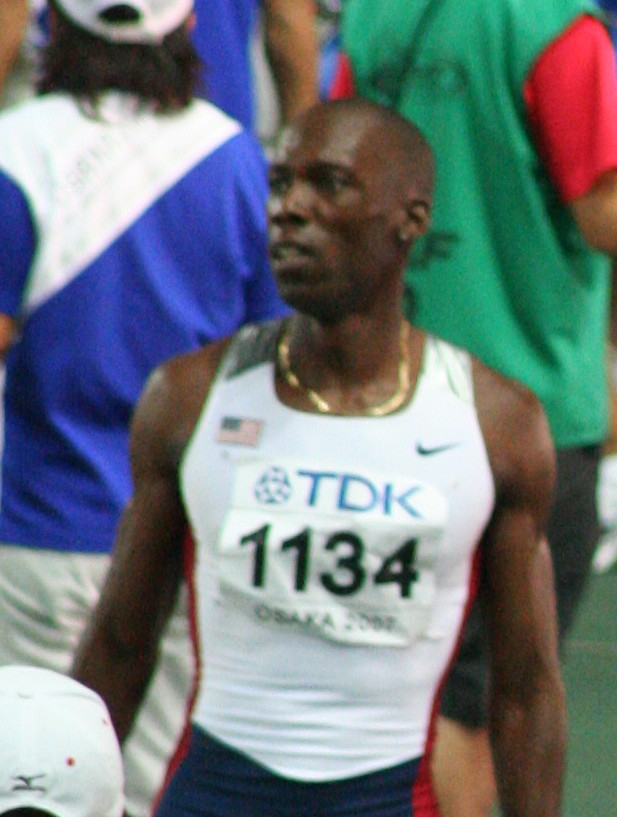
- Robinson in Osaka, Japan, 2007

Personal information
- Nickname: KD
- Born: July 19, 1976 (age 50) Fort Worth, Texas, U.S.
- Height: 6 ft 2 in (188 cm)
- Weight: 165 lb (75 kg)

Sport
- Sport: Track
- Events: 800 meters, 1500 meters
- College team: TCU
- Club: Santa Monica Track Club
- Turned pro: 1998
- Retired: 2013
- Now coaching: TCU

Achievements and titles
- Highest world ranking: 6
- Personal bests: 800 meters: 1:43.68; 1500 metres: 3:46.74

Khadevis Robinson (born July 19, 1976) is an American retired middle-distance runner and currently serves as the Director of Track and Field for the TCU Horned Frogs.

Robinson specialized in the 800 metres with his personal best time being 1:43.68 minutes, which he achieved in August 2006 in Rieti. He is a four-time US champion, both outdoors and indoors. He has competed at seven consecutive editions of the World Championships in Athletics, from 1999 to 2011. Robinson represented the United States at the 2004 Athens Olympics and the 2012 London Olympics.

== Biography ==
Robinson was born in Dallas, Texas and grew up in Fort Worth, Texas. Robinson was raised by his mother and his stepfather on the south side of Fort Worth. In an effort to harness his energy, his parents encouraged him to try out for all sports. Robinson played almost every sport as a child but he was particularly drawn to football. He loved football, yet after breaking his wrist his junior year, he started to focus on Track and Field. Robinson states that he only ran track and field because of the girls and to help him prepare for football.

Robinson quickly found himself falling into the patterns of the environment he lived in and his junior year was a challenge. With the help from his grandmother and his biological father, Robinson was able to avoid some of the pitfalls and started to excel in football and track his senior year of high school.

The turning point came after the death of his stepfather as this ignited his focus and he was determined to graduate and attend college.

== Running career ==
=== Collegiate ===
Robinson was a multiple NCAA National Champion where he ran for Texas Christian University and earned his undergraduate degree in Social Work. While at TCU, Robinson was very active on campus. Robinson was the Vice President of NASW (National Association of Social Work) TCU, a leader in the House of Reps, a member of Intercom ( Leadership rout on campus) and Vice President of BSC ( Black Student Caucus).

While at TCU, Robinson was a multiple Conference Champion in the 800 meters and the 4x400 meter relay. During Robinson's senior campaign, he became the NCAA Champion in the 800 meters while becoming the TCU Male Athlete of the Year. Robinson later earned his master's degree in Public Administration from California State University, Los Angeles in 2004.

==== Post-collegiate ====
Robinson kickstarted his professional career in 1999 by winning the 1999 USA Indoor and Outdoor 800 Meter Championship.

He eventually won the historical Prefontaine Classic.

After 1999 Robinson had a string of near misses. He placed 4th in 2000 barely missing an Olympic berth. In 2001, 2003 and 2004 Robinson placed 2nd at the USA National Championships outdoors. Finally after 5 years, Robinson returned to the top of the USA 800 field by becoming the 2005, 2006 and 2007 National Champion in the 800 meters. His times steadily improved throughout those years. Robinson broke a 21-year-old Modesto Relays 800 meter record in 2005 with a time of 1:45.35 minutes.

Robinson also broke the Mt. Sac record that had stood for over 2 decades.

Robinson ran for the Santa Monica Track Club for his post collegiate career, coached by former teammate Johnny Gray. Robinson has adopted Gray's hard front-running style, frequently taking races out hard into the "Gray Zone."

Robinson helped the USA 4×800 m relay team break the 24-year-old world record and 20-year-old American record with a registered time of 7:02.82 minutes at the Memorial Van Damme meet in Brussels on August 25, 2006. Robinson ran the fastest leg of all competing teams in the relay with a time of 1:43.8. He finished fifth at the 2006 World Athletics Final and sixth at the 2006 World Cup.

He won the 800 m at the 2008 USA Indoor Track & Field Championships on February 23, 2008. At the USA Olympic Trials in Eugene, Oregon, Khadevis finished fourth in the 800m race, being passed by Christian Smith performing a dive across the finish line to complete what has been called the "Oregon Sweep" missing, by one spot, a berth in the 2008 Olympic Games in Beijing.

After the 2008 Olympic Trials Robinson became frustrated and considered retirement; however he decided to persevere over the course of the next four years. As a 35-year-old, he took one more shot at making the Olympics. On June 25, 2012 he ran in the 2012 United States Olympic Trials final. Unlike his typical races, Robinson stayed off the pace as Charles Jock and Duane Solomon took the race out under 50 seconds for the first lap. Robinson even trailed notable kicker Nicholas Symmonds through the race. But when it was time to move, Solomon broke away from the field with Symmonds and then Robinson chasing. Symmonds passed Solomon on the home stretch. Robinson was the strongest of the rest of the field chasing Solomon, catching him at the line and securing his return to the United States Olympic Team.

== Coaching career ==
Robinson started his coaching career by coaching at Louisville High School (Woodland Hills, California). Robinson also coached open and professional athletes starting in 2006. In 2010 Robinson became the Head Cross Country and Distance coach for UNLV (University of Nevada, Las Vegas). Robinson then became the Head Women's Cross Country/Distance coach for Ohio State University. Robinson guided the Buckeyes to some top finishes and some school records. After only one year, Robinson was offered an opportunity to coach at one of the premier track and field programs in the nation, LSU (Louisiana State University). He subsequently left LSU in summer of 2017 to return to Ohio State University as both the men's and women's distance track and cross country coach.

In July 2022, Robinson was hired at TCU as its Director of Track and Field. He also is the primary coach for the middle distance events at TCU.

== Personal ==
Robinson co-founded the YTRC ( Youth Track and Running Club) in Santa Monica, which is a 501 c3 non profit organization serving youth in Santa Monica, Malibu, and Beverly Hills. Robinson was also awarded the Doherty Fellowship to do research. Robinson is also an active member of Athletes for Hope. Robinson was past president of the TFAA (Track and Field Athletes Association). Robinson is an active member of Kappa Alpha Psi fraternity.

== DVD ==
"Explore Your Core" (2009)
