= Athletics at the 2015 Pan American Games – Men's 1500 metres =

Men's 1500 metres at the 2015 Pan American Games
- Venue: CIBC Pan Am and Parapan Am Athletics Stadium
- Dates: July 24
- Competitors: 15 from 11 nations
- Winning time: 3:41.41

Medalists
| Gold medal | Andrew Wheating | United States |
| Silver medal | Nathan Brannen | Canada |
| Bronze medal | Charles Philibert-Thiboutot | Canada |

The men's 1500 metres sprint competition of the athletics events at the 2015 Pan American Games will take place between the 23 and 24 of July at the CIBC Pan Am and Parapan Am Athletics Stadium in Toronto, Canada. The defending Pan American Games champion is Leandro de Oliveira of Brazil.

== Records ==
Prior to this competition, the existing world and Pan American Games records were as follows:

| World record | Hicham El Guerrouj (MAR) | 3:26.00 | Rome, Italy | July 14, 1998 |
| Pan American Games record | Hudson de Souza (BRA) | 3:36.32 | Rio de Janeiro, Brazil | July 25, 2007 |

== Qualification ==
Each National Olympic Committee (NOC) was able to enter up to two entrants providing they had met the minimum standard (3.49.00) in the qualifying period (January 1, 2014 to June 28, 2015).

== Schedule ==
| Date | Time | Round |
|---|---|---|
| July 24, 2015 | 18:05 | Final |

== Results ==
All times shown are in seconds.

| KEY: | q | Fastest non-qualifiers | Q | Qualified | NR | National record | PB | Personal best | SB | Seasonal best | DQ | Disqualified |

=== Final ===
| Rank | Name | Nationality | Time | Notes |
|---|---|---|---|---|
| 1st place, gold medalist(s) | Andrew Wheating | United States | 3:41.41 | |
| 2nd place, silver medalist(s) | Nathan Brannen | Canada | 3:41.66 | |
| 3rd place, bronze medalist(s) | Charles Philibert-Thiboutot | Canada | 3:41.79 | |
| 4 | Carlos Díaz | Chile | 3:42.09 | |
| 5 | José Juan Esparza | Mexico | 3:42.52 | |
| 6 | Federico Bruno | Argentina | 3:42.88 | |
| 7 | Kyle Merber | United States | 3:43.60 | |
| 8 | Thiago André | Brazil | 3:43.71 | |
| 9 | Carlos dos Santos | Brazil | 3:44.36 | |
| 10 | Iván López | Chile | 3:48.54 | |
| 11 | Andy González | Cuba | 3:49.06 | |
| 12 | Georman Rivas | Costa Rica | 3:51.46 | PB |
| 13 | Marvin Blanco | Venezuela | 3:54.05 | |
| 14 | Gerard Giraldo | Colombia | 3:56.13 | |
| 15 | Lamont Marshall | Bermuda | 4:00.28 | |
