= Nick Symmonds =

American athlete and YouTube personality (born 1983)

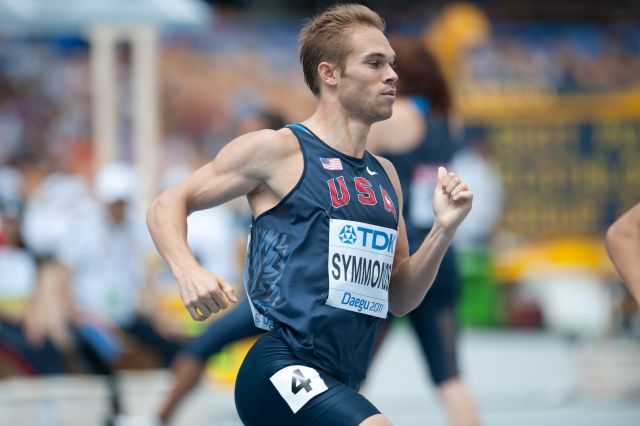
- Symmonds in 2011

Personal information
- Born: 30 December 1983 (age 42) Blytheville, Arkansas, U.S.
- Height: 5 ft 11 in (1.80 m)
- Weight: 206 lb (93 kg)

Sport
- Sport: Athletics (middle-distance running)
- College team: Willamette University
- Club: Brooks
- Turned pro: 2006
- Coached by: Danny Mackey; Sam Lapray
- Retired: 2018

Achievements and titles
- Personal bests: *All information from athlete's World Athletics profile unless otherwise noted.: Outdoors; 100 m: 11.52 (Eugene 2019, Masters 35+); 200 m: 24.39 (Eugene 2020, Masters 35+); 400 m: 47.45 (Dublin 2012); 600 m: 1:14.47 (Eugene 2008); 800 m: 1:42.95 (London 2012); 1000 m: 2:16.35 (Eugene 2010); 1500 m: 3:34.55 (Monaco 2013); Mile: 3:59.68 (Nashville 2015); 3000 m: 8:20.42 (Seattle 2015); Indoors; 600 m: 1:16.89i (New York 2013); 800 m: 1:46.48i (Valencia 2008); 1000 m: 2:18.87i (New York 2014); Mile: 3:56.72i (Seattle 2007); Road; Mile: 4:00.1h (New York 2013); 5 kilometers: 15:49 (Boise 2014); Marathon: 3:00:35 (Honolulu 2017); Other; Beer mile: 5:19 (2012)
Medal record
Men's athletics
Representing the United States
World Championships
Silver medal – second place	2013 Moscow	800 m

Nicholas Boone Symmonds (born December 30, 1983) is an American YouTube personality and retired middle-distance runner from Boise, Idaho, who specialized in the 800 meters and 1500 meters. At Willamette University, he won seven NCAA Division III titles outdoors. Symmonds is a 6-time US national 800 meters champion. He has competed in the 800m at two Olympic Games, reaching the semi-finals in Beijing 2008, and finishing fifth in the London 2012 final, running a personal best of 1:42.95 behind David Rudisha's world record of 1:40.91. The following year, he won a silver medal in the 800 meters at the 2013 World Championships, having previously finished sixth in the 2009 final and fifth in the 2011 final.

Symmonds signed with Brooks Running in January 2014 after a 7-year sponsorship with Nike. In October 2014, Symmonds and his coach Sam Lapray co-founded Run Gum, a supplement company which makes functional chewing gum.

Following his retirement, Symmonds gained more popularity in 2020 through his YouTube channel which primarily focuses on running, powerlifting, and fitness. In 2025, Symmonds summited Mount Everest, becoming the first person to both summit Everest and run a sub four-minute mile, with his 3:56.72 mile personal best set in 2007.

== Early life and education ==
Symmonds was born on December 30, 1983, in Blytheville, Arkansas. His family moved to Boise, Idaho when he was three-years old. His father Jeffrey Symmonds is a surgeon, and his mother Andrea is a teacher. Raised in Boise, Symmonds is a 2002 graduate of Bishop Kelly High School.

An avid outdoorsman, Symmonds earned his Eagle Scout award in high school. In high school, he won state championships in the 800 meters, 1600 meters, 3200 meters, and the 4 × 400 m relay. His high school personal bests were 1:53 in the 800 meters, 4:20 in the 1600 meters, and 9:47 in the 3200 meters.

He chose Willamette University in Salem, Oregon over other schools that could offer athletic scholarships. At Willamette, an NCAA Division III school, Symmonds earned a degree in biochemistry in 2006 and is a member of the Sigma Chi fraternity.

== Running career ==
=== Collegiate ===
While at Willamette, he won the 800 m NCAA championship race all four years and 1500 m NCAA championship race as a freshman, junior, and senior. Symmonds' collegiate best in the 800m of 1:45.83 ranked No. 1 in NCAA Division III history for twenty years. His 1500m collegiate best of 3:40.91 ranks No. 3 all-time in NCAA Division III. Though Symmonds is widely regarded as Willamette's most decorated athlete, his poor relationship with Head Coach Matt McGuirk has prevented wide celebration of his athletic achievements at his alma mater.

Year	Northwest Conference Cross Country	NCAA Cross Country	Northwest Conference Outdoor	NCAA Outdoor
2005-06	25:18.1 1st	27:12.2 93rd	1:55.39 1st 4:04.75 1st	1:49.59 1st 3:49.24 1st
2004-05	26:27.5 7th	25:49.2 84th	1:52.60 1st	1:49.87 1st 3:54.20 1st
2003-04			1:55.51 1st	1:50.87 1st
2002-03	26:16.7 8th	26:18.3 89th		1:49.51 1st 3:46.66 1st

=== Post-collegiate ===
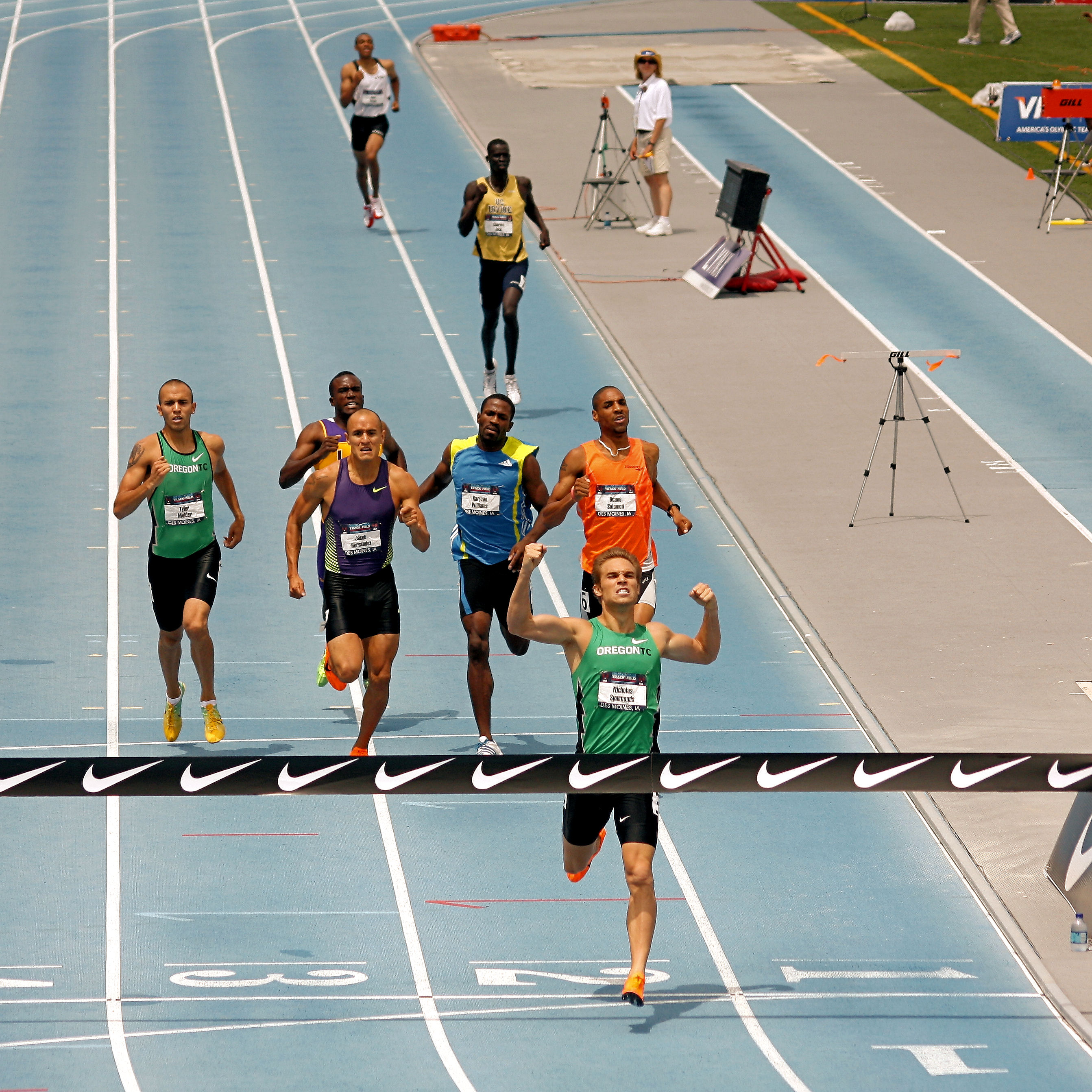
Symmonds during 2010 USA Outdoor Track and Field Championships

After college, Symmonds joined the Oregon Track Club Elite. A seven-time outdoor track champion at the NCAA III level, he was runner-up at the AT&T USA Outdoor Track and Field Championships in 2006 in the 800m race. In 2007, he won the 800m race at the Prefontaine Classic meet in Eugene, Oregon, with a then personal best time of 1:44.54, upsetting the current Olympic champion Yuriy Borzakovskiy by beating him with his own come-from-behind strategy.

In 2008, Symmonds won the United States Olympic Trials 800m final held in Eugene, Oregon with a personal best time of 1:44.10. He was the first of three Oregon associated athletes to finish at the top of this race before the home crowd, the other two being Andrew Wheating from the University of Oregon and Oregon Track Club training partner Christian Smith, an event referred to as the "Oregon sweep" and replayed many times in television coverage of the meet. This qualified all three men for the U.S. Olympic Team for the 2008 Summer Olympics in Beijing, China, for the 800 m race. At the Beijing Olympics, Symmonds won his first-round heat, then finished a non-qualifying fifth place in his semifinal heat with a time of 1:46.96, 0.73 seconds behind the winner of that heat.

Symmonds continued to improve in 2009, winning the USATF Championships over Khadevis Robinson, which qualified him to represent the United States at the World Championships. As part of his preparation for the championships, Symmonds ran a personal best of 1:43.83 on July 29, 2009, in Monaco. A few weeks later, Symmonds became the first American to qualify for the final of the men's 800m since 1997. He finished sixth in 1:45.71. In 2010, he lowered his personal best again, to 1:43.76, while finishing third behind David Rudisha's 1:41.01 world record at the IAAF World Challenge track and field meet in Rieti, Italy.

On June 25, 2012, Symmonds returned to the 2012 United States Olympic Trials again on his home track in Eugene, Oregon. The race went out fast, with Charles Jock leading Duane Solomon through a sub-50 second first lap. Atypically, Symmonds was not far off that pace. As Jock faded, Solomon charged off to a big lead through the final turn. Symmonds ran around the field and sprinted past Solomon on the homestretch to make his second Olympic team.

At the London Olympics, Symmonds was one of the two time qualifiers for the final of the 800m. He placed fifth in the final with a new personal best of 1:42.95; David Rudisha placed first in the world record time of 1:40.91, with Nijel Amos of Botswana second, Timothy Kitum of Kenya third, and Symmonds' teammate Duane Solomon fourth.

In 2013, Symmonds achieved his highest placing at an international championship, winning a silver medal at the 2013 IAAF World Championships in Athletics by running a season's best of 1:43.55, second only to Ethiopia's Mohammed Aman. At the time, this was the highest an American had ever finished in the men's 800 meters at the World Championships.

Symmonds was removed from the U.S. team at the 2015 World Championships in Athletics due to a sponsorship rights conflict between personal sponsor Brooks and U.S. sponsor Nike.

Symmonds had to forego racing the 2016 Olympic Trials due to an injured ankle. He retired after being eliminated in the heats of the 2017 US Championships.

== Run Gum ==
In 2014, Symmonds and his former coach, Sam Lapray, founded Run Gum, which markets a caffeinated chewing gum to athletes. In January 2016 Run Gum filed an antitrust lawsuit against USA Track and Field for rules that Symmonds felt suppress competition. In May, a federal judge dismissed the suit.

Symmonds often advertises Run Gum on his YouTube channel, through giving away Run Gum products as challenge prizes. There has also been several Run Gum social media accounts created, the most prominent of which is a TikTok account with over 750 thousand followers and 38 million likes.

== After retirement ==
=== YouTube ===
Nick Symmonds

YouTube information
- Channels: Nick Symmonds; Nick Symmonds Too
- Subscribers: 1.71 million (Nick Symmonds); 56.3 thousand (Nick Symmonds Too)
- Views: 591.7 million (Nick Symmonds); 6.9 million (Nick Symmonds Too)
- Last updated: May 29, 2025

In 2017, Symmonds' original intention of creating his YouTube channel was to vlog the final two weeks of his pro running career. His channel broke out in late 2019. In his YouTube videos, he often refers to himself as "The Bison". His content focuses on challenges involving fitness and running. Sometime in 2020 he signed a deal with Gymshark.

In June and July 2020, Symmonds became a topic of controversy in the running community when he organized events ignoring social distancing guidance for his videos. That same year, Symmonds started a second YouTube channel named 'Nick Symmonds Too', consisting of reaction, tutorial and challenge videos of shorter length.

Throughout the 2020s, Symmonds' channel grew in popularity. As his channel grew, Symmonds became known by many as "The MrBeast of Fitness", with the channel motto being, "It Pays to Be Fit!". As a one million subscriber special, Symmonds gathered one million pennies, and subscribers were allowed to keep as many as they could carry to a scale.

On November 10, 2023, Symmonds announced via a video on his channel he was taking a break from his YouTube career. He returned on August 31, 2024, with a video on climbing Denali, the highest peak in North America.

=== Mile to Mountain ===
On May 1, 2018, Symmonds announced his official retirement from track & field, along with his intention to climb the Seven Summits. Symmonds refers to this goal as Mile to Mountain. Symmonds successfully summited Mount Everest in May 2025, thus becoming the first person in history to both summit Everest and run a sub four-minute mile, with a 3:56.72 mile personal best set in 2007. As of May 2025, Symmonds has climbed four of the Seven Summits; Kilimanjaro, Puncak Jaya, Denali, and Everest. Alongside his Mile to Mountain goal, Symmonds worked on summiting all fifty U.S. state highpoints over a period of ten years, finishing in 2024 on Denali, Alaska.

== Personal life ==
At the 2013 World Championships in Athletics in Moscow, Symmonds was a vocal critic of Russia's "anti-gay" laws. He dedicated his silver medal to his gay and lesbian friends.

Symmonds published an article in the November 2013 issue of Runner's World magazine advocating that Congress should "ban assault rifles and handguns for everyone except police and military personnel."

In 2017, Symmonds was hired by the newly formed Track Town Summer Series Professional Track & Field league to act as General Manager for the team representing San Francisco. Symmonds opposed what he considers absurdly strict rules restricting athletes' ability to market themselves. For the 2012 season, he auctioned off space on his left shoulder for a temporary tattoo to advertise a sponsor. The winning bidder was a Milwaukee advertising agency, Hanson Dodge Creative, which paid $11,000 for the space to advertise their Twitter handle. During restricted competitions such as the Olympic Trials and the Olympic Games, Symmonds was required to cover up the tattoo with white tape, which ends up drawing attention to the tattoo advertising underneath. Prior to Symmonds, 2004 Olympic champion shot-putter Adam Nelson actively sold space on his shirt during the 2005 season, when he won the IAAF World Championships. The practice is also common in boxing.

On the matter, Symmonds commented:

I've never had a problem speaking out about something that bothers me, The biggest thing that rubs me the wrong way is that governing bodies want to control the space I feel I should control.

— Nick Symmonds

In 2020, Symmonds married Tiana Baur. He filed for divorce in September 2024. Symmonds has a pet rabbit named Mortimer, with whom he posed for a PETA ad campaign against animal testing. He is also an avid fisherman and pilot.

== Circuit and national competition wins ==
Year	Competition	Event	Time	Ref
2007	Boston Indoor Games	800 m	1:48.15	
2007	Prefontaine Classic	800 m	1:44.54	
2007	United States Indoor Track and Field Championships	800 m	1:48.73	
2008	United States Olympic Trials	800 m	1:44.10	
2009	Boston Indoor Games	1000 m	2:20.52	
2009	Prefontaine Classic	800 m	1:45.86	
2009	United States Outdoor Track and Field Championships	800m	1:45.86	
2010	United States Outdoor Track and Field Championships	800m	1:45.98	
2011	United States Outdoor Track and Field Championships	800m	1:44.17	
2012	United States Olympic Trials	800m	1:43.92	
2015	United States Outdoor Track and Field Championships	800m	1:44.53	

== International competitions ==
Year	Competition	Event	Time	Place	Ref
2008	Olympic Games	800m	1:46.96	5th (semifinal)	
2009	World Championships	800m	1:45.71	6th	
2011	World Championships	800m	1:45.12	5th	
2012	Olympic Games	800m	1:42.95	5th	
2013	World Championships	800m	1:43.55	2nd	

== Publications ==
- Symmonds, Nick (2014). Life Outside the Oval Office: The Track Less Traveled. ISBN 978-1935270324.
- Symmonds, Nick (2020). How to Be a Better Runner.
