= Kristal Yush =

American hammer thrower

Personal information
- Born: January 8, 1982 (age 43) Concord, New Hampshire, United States

Sport
- Sport: Track and field

Kristal Yush (married name Kostiew; born January 8, 1982) is an American hammer thrower. She finished fourth in the women's hammer throw event at the 2007 Pan American Games.
