= Christian Smith (runner) =

American middle-distance runner

Christian Smith (born October 31, 1983) is an American middle-distance runner from Garfield, Kansas. He graduated from Pawnee Heights High School in 2002 and from Kansas State University in 2006.

== Biography ==
At K-State, Smith was the NCAA champion in the men's mile at the 2006 NCAA Indoor Track & Field Championships, and was also a 1500m All-American in 2006, a four-time Indoor All-American (in 2003, 2004, 2005, & 2006), collegiate record holder in the indoor 1000m, and he also holds the indoor 1000m school record and the outdoor 800m and 1500m school records.

Smith joined the Oregon Track Club Elite in 2007 and qualified for the 2008 Beijing Olympics in the 800m by diving to finish in third place at the 2008 Eugene Olympic Trials, edging out Khadevis Robinson. The finish of the race, the famous Oregon sweep on home track, was replayed many times in coverage of the meet.See it on a private youtube videoand as presented on TV.

Smith qualified to return to the Olympic Trials in 2012, but was unable to get out of the preliminary round. Smith's personal best for 800m is 1'44"86, achieved in 2006.
