= April Steiner Bennett =

American pole vaulter (born 1980)

Coach Bennett April Steiner Bennett
Personal information
- Full name: April Steiner Bennett
- National team: United States
- Born: April 22, 1980 (age 46) Mesa, Arizona, United States
- Occupations: XC and Track teacher and Robotics Teacher

Sport
- Country: United States
- Sport: Track and field
- Event: Pole vault
- University team: University of Arkansas
- Now coaching: Woodland XC and Track

Achievements and titles
- Olympic finals: 8th (2008)
- Regional finals: Silver medal (2007 Pan Am Games)
- Personal best: 4.63m
Medal record
Representing United States
Pan American Games
Silver medal – second place	2007 Rio de Janeiro	Pole vault
- Updated on June 13, 2017

April Steiner Bennett (born April 22, 1980) is an American pole vaulter. Her personal best is 4.63 metres (15.2 ft), achieved in April 2008 in Norman, Oklahoma.

== Personal life ==
Bennett was born in Mesa, Arizona, United States. She is a Latter-day Saint. In 2004 she won Season 5, Episode 14 of Fear Factor. August 25th 2008 She graduated from the University of Arkansas where she serves as a volunteer assistant coach.

== Sporting career ==
She was Jessie Graff's idol in university, and competitor at collegiate pole vault meets.

She won the silver medal at the 2007 Pan Am Games in pole vault representing USA.

She finished 8th at the 2008 Beijing Summer Olympics in pole vault represented USA.

Inspired by Jessie Graff's performance in American Ninja Warrior, she competed at the Los Angeles Qualifier, in the 2017 season 9 season opener. She competed with the nickname "Vault Chick".
