= American Ninja Warrior season 11 =

Season of American reality/sport competition television series American Ninja Warrior

American Ninja Warrior
- Season 11
- Hosted by: Matt Iseman; Akbar Gbaja-Biamila; Zuri Hall
- Finals venue: Las Vegas Strip
- No. of episodes: 16

Release
- Original network: NBC
- Original release: May 29 – September 16, 2019

Season chronology
- ← Previous; Season 10 Next → Season 12

The eleventh season of American Ninja Warrior premiered on May 29, 2019, on NBC. City qualifying and finals competitions were held in Los Angeles, Atlanta, Oklahoma City, Seattle/Tacoma, marking the first time a course was held in the Pacific Northwest, Baltimore, and Cincinnati.

The course returns with new twists in the qualifying rounds, including changes to the Mega Wall, and a new reward competition, the Power Tower. Matt Iseman and Akbar Gbaja-Biamila returned for their respective tenth and seventh seasons while newcomer Zuri Hall joined the duo as a sideline reporter, replacing Kristine Leahy. Season 7 course finisher and "Total Victory" achiever Geoff Britten participated, marking his return to competition in the series but fell in Seattle/Tacoma Qualifying, marking the end of his season.

Drew Drechsel finished first and apparently became the third person to achieve "Total Victory" on American Ninja Warrior. He was arrested almost a year later on August 4, 2020, following accusations of federal child sex-related charges, with NBC and A. Smith & Co. Productions subsequently cutting ties with him the following day. Dreschel pled guilty on June 1, 2023, on one count of attempting to receive and enticement to travel for illicit child sexual conduct. On June 26, 2024, Dreschel was sentenced to 121 months in prison.

== Competition schedule ==
Qualifier airing	Finals airing	City	Episode taping	Location
May 29, 2019	July 15, 2019	Los Angeles, California	March 6–7, 2019	Universal Studios Hollywood Backlot
June 5, 2019	July 22, 2019	Atlanta, Georgia	March 24–25, 2019	The Home Depot Backyard at Mercedes-Benz Stadium
June 17, 2019	July 29, 2019	Oklahoma City, Oklahoma	April 12, 14, 2019	Oklahoma State Capitol
June 24, 2019	August 5, 2019	Seattle/Tacoma, Washington	May 11–12, 2019	Tacoma Dome
July 1, 2019	August 12, 2019	Baltimore, Maryland	April 28–29, 2019	Rash Field
July 8, 2019	August 19, 2019	Cincinnati, Ohio	May 24–25, 2019	2nd Street (in front of National Underground Railroad Freedom Center)

== Obstacles ==
Indicates obstacles created by fans for the "American Ninja Warrior Obstacle Design Challenge".

A new obstacle, the Power Tower, was also introduced. In the city qualifiers, the two fastest finalists from each course competed against each other for a "speed pass" that immediately advances the recipient to the National Finals. In the city finals courses, the Power Tower offered a "safety pass" that allows the recipient a second chance to complete Stage 1 or 2 of the National Finals. Most of the ninjas had to play their Safety Passes from the City Finals with 2 using it on Stage 1 (Drew Drechsel and Flip Rodriguez) and the other 3 using it on Stage 2 (Dave Cavanagh, Mathis 'Kid' Owhadi, and Karson Voiles). The only ninja who didn't play it was Michael Torres because he finished Stage 1 and 2 and it is not allowed to be used on Stage 3. The only ninjas who played it but failed to advance to Stage 3 were Flip Rodriguez, who timed out on the Water Walls after using it on Stage 1 when he fell on the Diving Boards, and Dave Cavanagh, who fell twice on Stage 2, first on Giant Walk the Plank, and then on the Extension Ladder.

=== Mega Wall changes ===
The Mega Wall, introduced in the tenth season, returns with new rules. Contestants must now choose which version to attempt—the 14.5-foot Warped Wall or the 18-foot Mega Wall—and cannot change once they have attempted one or the other. In addition, contestants are now allowed three attempts at the Mega Wall, and can win cash on any of them: $10,000 for scaling it on the first try, $5,000 on the second, or $2,500 on the third.

=== Power Tower ===
A new obstacle, the Power Tower, was also introduced. In the city qualifiers, the two fastest finalists from each course competed against each other for a "speed pass" that immediately advances the recipient to the National Finals. In the city finals courses, the Power Tower offered a "safety pass" that allows the recipient a second chance to complete Stage 1 or 2 of the National Finals. All the other ninjas with 2 using it on Stage 1 (Drew Dreschel and Flip Rodriguez) and the other 3 (Dave Cavanagh, Mathis 'Kid' Owahdi, and Karson Voiles) having to play their Safety Passes from the City Finals but the only one out of the six who didn't play it was Michael Torres because he finished Stage 1 and 2 and he cannot use it on Stage 3.

=== City Qualifying & Finals ===
Event		Obstacles										Finishers
Los Angeles	Qualifying	Shrinking Steps	Walk the Plank	Spring Forward	Diamond Dash	Spin Hopper	Warped Wall/Mega Wall	N/A				11
Los Angeles	Finals	Shrinking Steps	Walk the Plank	Spring Forward	Diamond Dash	Spin Hopper	Warped Wall	Salmon Ladder	The Hinge	Leaps of Faith	Spider Trap	2
Atlanta	Qualifying	Shrinking Steps	Off the Hook	Block Run	Bouncing Spider	Ferris Wheel	Warped Wall/Mega Wall	N/A				17
Atlanta	Finals	Shrinking Steps	Off the Hook	Block Run	Bouncing Spider	Ferris Wheel	Warped Wall	Salmon Ladder	Up For Grabs	Fallout	Spider Trap	5
Oklahoma City	Qualifying	Shrinking Steps	Wing Swing	Fly Wheels	Diving Boards	Coconut Climb	Warped Wall/Mega Wall	N/A				13
Oklahoma City	Finals	Shrinking Steps	Wing Swing	Fly Wheels	Diving Boards	Coconut Climb	Warped Wall	Salmon Ladder	Crazy Clocks	Snap Back	Spider Trap	5
Seattle Tacoma	Qualifying	Shrinking Steps	Lunatic Ledges	Barrel Roll	Broken Bridge	Lightning Bolts	Warped Wall/Mega Wall	N/A				13
Seattle Tacoma	Finals	Shrinking Steps	Lunatic Ledges	Barrel Roll	Broken Bridge	Lightning Bolts	Warped Wall	Salmon Ladder	Floating Monkey Bars	Northwest Passage	Spider Trap	0
Baltimore	Qualifying	Shrinking Steps	Double Twister	Dangerous Curves	Hazard Cones	Crank It Up	Warped Wall/Mega Wall	N/A				9
Baltimore	Finals	Shrinking Steps	Double Twister	Dangerous Curves	Hazard Cones	Crank It Up	Warped Wall	Salmon Ladder	Angry Birds	Cane Lane	Spider Trap	0
Cincinnati	Qualifying	Shrinking Steps	Ring Swing	Spinning Bridge	Wingnuts	Slingshot	Warped Wall/Mega Wall	N/A				11
Cincinnati	Finals	Shrinking Steps	Ring Swing	Spinning Bridge	Wingnuts	Slingshot	Warped Wall	Salmon Ladder	Slam Dunk	Spinball Wizard	Spider Trap	7

=== National Finals ===
Event	Obstacle(s)								Finishers
Stage 1	Archer Steps	Spin Your Wheels	Double Dipper	Jumping Spider	Tire Run	Warped Wall	Diving Boards	Twist & Fly	28
Stage 2	Giant Walk The Plank	Extension Ladder	Snapback	Swing Surfer	Grim Sweeper	Water Walls			21
Stage 3	Grip & Tip	Iron Summit	Crazy Clocks	Ultimate Cliffhanger	Pipe Dream	Cane Lane	Flying Bar		2
Stage 4	Rope Climb								1

== City courses ==
Bold denotes the finishers who completed the Mega Wall and received a prize money bonus ($10,000, $5,000, or $2,500 based on number of attempts).

Italics denote the Top 5 women who also finished in the overall Top 30 and the Top 2 women who also finished in the overall Top 12.

Underline represents the contestant who won the Speed Pass on the Power Tower in qualifying.

Green represents the contestant who won the Safety Pass on the Power Tower in the finals.

=== Los Angeles ===
==== Qualifying ====
The Los Angeles qualifiers featured two new obstacles, Walk The Plank and Spring Forward. The course took place on the backlot of Obstacle Academy. The Los Angeles Clippers cheerleaders along with mascot "Chuck the Condor" who were firing up and handing out t-shirts to the crowd. Former NBA player Kareem Rush ran the course as 10-time NBA all-star Paul Pierce cheered him on. Gymnast Danell Leyva, a US champion and 3-time Olympic medalist, completed the course.

Top 30 Competitors
Rank	Competitor	Time	Furthest Obstacle
1	Hunter Guerard POM Run Of The Night	1:34.03	Finished
2	David Campbell	1:35.99	Finished
3	Kevin Bull	1:37.26	Finished
4	Danell Leyva	2:23.68	Finished
5	Dayvon Hancox	2:28.93	Finished
6	**Scott Willson**	2:41.25	Finished (Mega Wall)
7	David Alvarez	2:59.71	Finished
8	Arnold Hernandez	3:44.54	Finished
9	Brian Burk	3:58.38	Finished
10	Brian Kretsch	4:17.67	Finished
11	Jonah Bonner	4:34.93	Finished
12	Kyle Soderman	1:10.67	Mega Wall
13	Flip Rodriguez	1:40.77	Mega Wall
14	Ruben Arellano	1:49.46	Warped Wall
15	Hunter Swan	3:05.34	Mega Wall
16	Corey McCoy	3:21.22	Warped Wall
17	Adam Rayl	0:38.17	Spin Hopper
18	Seth Rogers	0:47.40	Spin Hopper
19	Ben Udy	1:17.18	Spin Hopper
20	Westley Silvestri	1:37.57	Spin Hopper
21	Noah Garfield	1:52.39	Spin Hopper
22	Austin Seibert	1:59.68	Spin Hopper
23	Samantha Bush	2:02.63	Spin Hopper
24	Kevin Fisch	0:56.12	Diamond Dash
25	Rebekah Bonilla	1:24.29	Diamond Dash
26	Verdale Benson	1:28.43	Diamond Dash
27	Lee Cates	0:17.03	Spring Forward
28	Thomas Kofron	0:19.06	Spring Forward
29	Anthony Trucks	0:26.56	Spring Forward
30	Steven Barbarito	0:29.96	Spring Forward

Top 5 Women
Rank	Competitor	Time	Furthest Obstacle
1	Samantha Bush	2:02.63	Spin Hopper
2	Rebekah Bonilla	1:24.29	Diamond Dash
3	Emmi Rose		Spring Forward
4	Anna Shumaker		Walk The Plank
5	Tiana Webberley		Walk The Plank

==== Finals ====
The Los Angeles finals had one new obstacle, Leaps of Faith. Starting this season, only the Top 12 competitors in each city would move on to the National Finals. In Los Angeles, a total of 15 competitors moved on to the National Finals, as the Top 12 contestants, the Top 2 Women, and Hunter Guerard, the Speed Pass winner in qualifying, advanced. The Los Angeles Chargers cheerleaders and "Thunderbolt" Drumline along with Sean Culkin were in the crowd cheering on the competitors and pro football player Anthony Trucks who ran the course.

Top 13 Competitors
Rank	Competitor	Time	Furthest Obstacle
1	Flip Rodriguez	4:13.48	Finished
2	Brian Kretsch POM Run Of The Night	5:42.71	Finished
3	Hunter Guerard		Leaps of Faith
4	Kevin Bull	2:35.59	Leaps of Faith
5	Danell Leyva		Leaps of Faith
6	David Campbell		Leaps of Faith
7	Scott Willson		Leaps of Faith
8	Adam Rayl		Leaps of Faith
9	Seth Rogers		Leaps of Faith
10	Ben Udy		Leaps of Faith
11	Brian Burk		Leaps of Faith
12	Hunter Swan		Leaps of Faith
13	Verdale Benson		Leaps of Faith

Top 2 Women
Rank	Competitor	Time	Furthest Obstacle
1	Tiana Webberley		The Hinge
2	Anna Shumaker		Warped Wall

=== Atlanta ===
==== Qualifying ====
In a tie-in with the 2019 movie The Secret Life of Pets 2, the course had a theme inspired by the movie. A preview also aired during the episode. Additionally, after his run, lab technician Andrew "Roo" Yori was awarded a $20,000 check from the creators of the film for his nonprofit organization, The Wallace The Pitbull Foundation. The Atlanta qualifiers featured two new obstacles, Off The Hook and the Ferris Wheel. The competition took place outside Mercedes-Benz Stadium, home of the Atlanta Falcons; their cheerleaders and mascot Freddie Falcon were in attendance to cheer on competitors. Celebrity competitors included former NFL cornerback and two-time Super Bowl champion Tyrone Poole who made it to the Ferris Wheel obstacle, and World Series of Poker player Tony Miles who only made it to the third obstacle, thus losing the bet his friend put on him to hit the buzzer at 25:1 odds.

Top 30 Competitors
Rank	Competitor	Time	Furthest Obstacle
1	Tyler Gillett	1:07.68	Finished
2	**Drew Drechsel**	1:08.32	Finished (Mega Wall)
3	R.J. Roman	1:16.90	Finished
4	**Caleb Bergstrom**	2:00.84	Finished (Mega Wall)
5	Jody Freeman	2:12.99	Finished
6	**Kevin Carbone**	2:21.44	Finished (Mega Wall)
7	Travis Rosen	2:21.99	Finished
8	Kenny Niemitalo	2:28.57	Finished
9	Brett Sims	2:33.79	Finished
10	Jordan Hatton	2:37.05	Finished
11	Casey Suchocki POM Run of the Night	2:44.56	Finished
12	Josiah Singleton	2:55.36	Finished
13	Chris Howard	3:17.78	Finished
14	**Ryan Stratis**	3:21.23	Finished (Mega Wall)
15	Roo Yori	3:27.91	Finished
16	Chad Hohn	3:33.36	Finished
17	Rochambeau Dolcine	3:50.88	Finished
18	Jon Dilulllo	1:20.83	Mega Wall
19	Neil Craver	1:33.77	Mega Wall
20	Eddy Stewart	3:22.93	Warped Wall
21	Jessica Clayton	4:13.25	Warped Wall
22	Travis Rust	1:02.73	Ferris Wheel
23	Kirill Rebkovets	1:03.10	Ferris Wheel
24	Ronald Washington	1:12.29	Ferris Wheel
25	Caleb Auer	1:12.37	Ferris Wheel
26	Lucas Gomes	1:29.41	Ferris Wheel
27	Ben Wilson	1:33.34	Ferris Wheel
28	Glenn Davis	1:40.50	Ferris Wheel
29	Tyrone Poole	1:42.62	Ferris Wheel
30	Devin Harrelson	1:52.86	Ferris Wheel

Top 5 Women
Rank	Competitor	Time	Furthest Obstacle
1	Jessica Clayton	4:13.25	Warped Wall
2	Alyssa Varsalona	1:54.07	Ferris Wheel
3	Emily Durham	0:45.92	Bouncing Spider
4	Caitlyn Bergstrom	1:00.63	Bouncing Spider
5	Grace Sims	1:12.86	Bouncing Spider

==== Finals ====
The Atlanta Finals will feature 1 new obstacle, Up For Grabs. 15 contestants advanced to the National Finals from this region, as 13 competitors automatically advanced, as Drew Drechsel, who was in the Top 12, won the Speed Pass in qualifying, along with making it up the Mega Wall and now winning the Safety Pass, making ANW history by completing this trifecta. The Top 2 Women also advanced to the National Finals, as Caitlyn Bergstrom, along with her brother Caleb Bergstrom, also made ANW history, becoming the first brother/sister duo to both qualify for the National Finals, after making history by becoming the first brother/sister duo to qualify for the city finals in qualifying.

Top 13 Competitors
Rank	Competitor	Time	Furthest Obstacle
1	Drew Drechsel	3:37.79	Finished
2	Kevin Carbone	4:50.15	Finished
3	Tyler Gillett	5:47.79	Finished
4	Brett Sims	7:10.40	Finished
5	Ryan Stratis POM Run of the Night	8:42.98	Finished
6	R.J. Roman	3:43.93	Spider Trap
7	Jody Freeman	4:18.56	Spider Trap
8	Kenny Niemetalo	4:26.88	Spider Trap
9	Caleb Auer	3:16.04	Fallout
10	Caleb Bergstrom	2:16.09	Up For Grabs
11	Ronald Washington	2:36.36	Up For Grabs
12	Travis Rosen	2:50.35	Up For Grabs
13	Casey Suchocki	3:05.58	Up For Grabs

Top 2 Women
Rank	Competitor	Time	Furthest Obstacle
1	Caitlyn Bergstrom		Ferris Wheel
2	Jessica Clayton		Bouncing Spider

=== Oklahoma City ===
==== Qualifying ====
The Oklahoma City qualifiers featured three new obstacles, the Wing Swing, the Diving Boards and the Coconut Climb. In attendance hyping up the crowd was the Oklahoma City Thunder cheerleaders and drum line, along with mascot Rumble the Bison. Also, the Oklahoma State University cheerleaders and school mascot Pistol Pete helped cheer on the competitors. The ninja course was held just outside the Oklahoma State Capitol. Former Kansas State legislator Kevin Jones improved his performance from last year by making it to the second obstacle.

Top 30 Competitors
Rank	Competitor	Time	Furthest Obstacle
1	**Daniel Gil** POM Run of the Night	1:23.14	Finished (Mega Wall)
2	Matthew Day	1:50.12	Finished
3	Nick Fordney	1:56.95	Finished
4	**Karsten Williams**	2:13.82	Finished (Mega Wall)
5	Alex Blick	2:16.89	Finished
6	Brent Steffensen	2:17.67	Finished
7	David Wright	2:26.98	Finished
8	Ben Wales	2:29.07	Finished
9	Jeff Harris	2:51.79	Finished
10	Kendall Ortez	3:05.10	Finished
11	Chris Talon Green	3:39.13	Finished
12	Abel Gonzalez	3:51.64	Finished
13	Tyler Humphrey	5:01.84	Finished
14	Mathis Owhadi	1:10.37	Mega Wall
15	Jody Avila	1:37.35	Mega Wall
16	Josh Salinas	1:45.21	Mega Wall
17	Brian Burkhardt	1:54.62	Mega Wall
18	Jonathan Horton	1:01.49	Coconut Climb
19	Rick Hinnant	1:06.40	Coconut Climb
20	Josh Norton	1:07.31	Coconut Climb
21	Elliott Jolivette	1:07.80	Coconut Climb
22	Jonathan Bange	1:16.43	Coconut Climb
23	Damir Okanovic	1:24.79	Coconut Climb
24	Tremayne Dortch	1:27.39	Coconut Climb
25	Josh Harris	1:35.73	Coconut Climb
26	Chris Cambre	1:48.01	Coconut Climb
27	Madelynn McNeal	1:50.14	Coconut Climb
28	Maggi Thorne	2:01.17	Coconut Climb
29	Barclay Stockett	2:02.51	Coconut Climb
30	Taylor Amann	2:02.87	Coconut Climb

Top 5 Women
Rank	Competitor	Time	Furthest Obstacle
1	Madelynn McNeal	1:50.14	Coconut Climb
2	Maggi Thorne	2:01.17	Coconut Climb
3	Barclay Stockett	2:02.51	Coconut Climb
4	Taylor Amann	2:02.87	Coconut Climb
5	Karen Wiltin	3:29.12	Coconut Climb

==== Finals ====
The Oklahoma City finals introduced a new obstacle, Snap Back. In attendance among the crowd was Boomer, one of the mascots from the University of Oklahoma. A record for the most women to make it up the Warped Wall during a city finals round was set, as four women made it up the 14 1/2-foot Warped Wall, including Karen Wiltin who was the third mom to make it up the Warped Wall in American Ninja Warrior history. Maggi Thorne became the second mom to make it up the wall later that night. Taylor Amann became the second female in their rookie season to automatically qualify for the national finals, following Jesse Labreck, and later Mady Howard, who achieved the feat one week later during the Seattle/Tacoma city finals.

Top 13 Competitors
Rank	Competitor	Time	Furthest Obstacle
1	Daniel Gil	3:34.23	Finished
2	Mathis Owhadi	4:28.83	Finished
3	Karsten Williams	4:29.17	Finished
4	Jody Avila	5:11.20	Finished
5	David Wright	5:17.38	Finished
6	Jeff Harris	2:54.03	Snap Back
7	Brian Burkhardt	3:04.61	Snap Back
8	Nick Fordney	3:04.83	Snap Back
9	Josh Salinas	3:04.97	Snap Back
10	Ben Wales	3:08.85	Snap Back
11	Alex Blick	3:21.94	Snap Back
12	Kendall Ortez	2:03.90	Crazy Clocks
13	Damir Okanovic	2:24.88	Crazy Clocks

Top 2 Women
Rank	Competitor	Time	Furthest Obstacle
1	Taylor Amann	3:13.30	Crazy Clocks
2	Barclay Stockett	3:35.84	Crazy Clocks

=== Seattle/Tacoma ===
==== Qualifying ====
The Seattle/Tacoma qualifiers featured two new obstacles the Lunatic Ledges and Barrel Roll. Taking place inside the Tacoma Dome, this was ANW's first-ever indoor course. In the audience was "The 12s", Seattle Seahawks fan club, along with the Mariner Moose from the Seattle Mariners. Musician Ryan Phillips from rock band Story of the Year ran the course, making it to the fifth obstacle. Sprint car driver McKenna Haase also competed, getting to the third obstacle. U.S. Olympic decathlete Jeremy Taiwo gave the course a try, but failed on the Lightning Bolts. U.S. Olympic halfpipe skier Alex Ferreira also tried his luck on the course, only making it to the second obstacle. Former baseball player for the Mariners Ryan Rowland-Smith became the first MLB pitcher to compete, getting to the second obstacle. Also, Geoff Britten, who conquered Stage 4 in Season 7, made his return to the course. But his comeback was short-lived as he failed on the Broken Bridge, marking the first time he fell in qualifying.

PE teacher Sandy Zimmerman, a National Judo Champion, former Gonzaga University basketball player, and mother of three, became the first mom to finish the course in the show's history. She was also the first and oldest woman (age 42) to complete the course this season, soon followed by stuntwoman Jessie Graff who returned to ANW after a year absence.

Top 30 Competitors
Rank	Competitor	Time	Furthest Obstacle
1	Leif Sundberg	0:58.75	Finished
2	Sean Bryan	1:14.37	Finished
3	Jake Murray	1:25.37	Finished
4	Lorin Ball	1:39.59	Finished
5	David Moonen	1:46.38	Finished
6	Ben Martin	1:59.60	Finished
7	Alex Hatch	2:15.38	Finished
8	Jessie Graff	2:45.38	Finished
9	Scott Behrends	2:49.06	Finished
10	**Lance Pekus**	2:57.74	Finished (Mega Wall)
11	Marquez Green	3:03.13	Finished
12	Justin Gielski	3:18.51	Finished
13	Sandy Zimmerman	3:44.18	Finished
14	Josh Kronberg	1:31.63	Mega Wall
15	Karson Voiles	1:45.66	Mega Wall
16	Reko Rivera	2:02.11	Mega Wall
17	Dan Yager	2:07.76	Mega Wall
18	Bart Copeland	2:19.10	Mega Wall
19	Jackson Meyer	0:29.12	Lightning Bolts
20	Nick Hanson	0:45.34	Lightning Bolts
21	Nate Burkhalter	0:49.53	Lightning Bolts
22	Rainer Jundt	0:49.53	Lightning Bolts
23	Matt Dolce	1:00.82	Lightning Bolts
24	Brandon Varner	1:13.29	Lightning Bolts
25	Jeremy Taiwo	1:14.98	Lightning Bolts
26	Zack Scholes	1:17.07	Lightning Bolts
27	Michael Larlee	1:17.21	Lightning Bolts
28	Gavin Maxwell	1:17.62	Lightning Bolts
29	Glenn Albright	1:19.58	Lightning Bolts
30	Sean Darling-Hammond	1:19.84	Lightning Bolts

Top 5 Women
Rank	Competitor	Time	Furthest Obstacle
1	Jessie Graff	2:45.38	Finished
2	Sandy Zimmerman	3:44.18	Finished
3	Mady Howard	1:25.26	Lightning Bolts
4	Christi Marie	1:37.26	Lightning Bolts
5	Meagan Martin	1:50.19	Lightning Bolts

==== Finals ====
The city finals on this course introduced a new obstacle, Northwest Passage. Sean Bryan, who won the Speed Pass in qualifying, automatically qualified for the National Finals. This marked the first time in the show's history that no competitor completed the ninth obstacle on a city finals course and the third time in American Ninja Warrior history that a city finals course was uncompleted as the Lightning Bolts and Floating Monkey Bars took out over 80% of the competitors, leaving very few competitors who made it to the ninth obstacle.

Present to entertain the audience was Blue Thunder, the Seattle Seahawks' drumline.

Top 13 Competitors
Rank	Competitor	Time	Furthest Obstacle
1	Dan Yager	3:17.32	Northwest Passage
2	Karson Voiles	3:25.20	Northwest Passage
3	Jessie Graff	4:34.00	Northwest Passage
4	Lorin Ball	2:18.36	Floating Monkey Bars
5	Sean Bryan	2:20.20	Floating Monkey Bars
6	David Moonen	2:28.85	Floating Monkey Bars
7	Matt Dolce	2:44.35	Floating Monkey Bars
8	Zack Scholes	2:45.55	Floating Monkey Bars
9	Mady Howard	2:55.42	Floating Monkey Bars
10	Scott Behrends	3:14.40	Floating Monkey Bars
11	Nate Burkhalter	3:15.52	Floating Monkey Bars
12	Nick Hanson	3:20.83	Floating Monkey Bars
13	Sean Darling-Hammond	4:01.23	Floating Monkey Bars

Top 2 Women
Rank	Competitor	Time	Furthest Obstacle
1	Jessie Graff	4:34.00	Northwest Passage
2	Mady Howard	2:55.42	Floating Monkey Bars

=== Baltimore ===
==== Qualifying ====
The Baltimore qualifiers featured two new obstacles, the Dangerous Curves and the Hazard Cones. The course took place on Baltimore's Inner Harbor. Among the audience cheering on the competitors was the Baltimore Orioles' mascot, "The Oriole Bird", along with the University of Maryland cheerleaders and the Maryland Terrapins mascot, Testudo. Former WNBA player Tamika Catchings of the Indiana Fever competed on the course, making it to the Dangerous Curves, the third obstacle.

Top 30 Competitors
Rank	Competitor	Time	Furthest Obstacle
1	Dave Cavanagh	2:02.27	Finished
2	Conor Galvin	2:07.02	Finished
3	Anthony DeFranco	2:07.38	Finished
4	Lucas Reale	2:12.85	Finished
5	Jamie Rahn	3:08.56	Finished
6	Brandon Stenta	3:45.18	Finished
7	Branden Williams	4:03.91	Finished
8	Michael Silenzi	4:07.30	Finished
9	Garrett Lam	4:09.09	Finished
10	Joe Moravsky	2:32.03	Mega Wall
11	Najee Richardson	2:43.47	Mega Wall
12	Chris Wilczewski	2:55.13	Mega Wall
13	Joe Capo	1:02.09	Crank It Up
14	Tristan Poffenberger	1:07.44	Crank It Up
15	Alex Goodwin	1:19.63	Crank It Up
16	Clayton Mirage	1:20.30	Crank It Up
17	Zach Barefoot	1:23.54	Crank It Up
18	0Eli Bell	1:30.15	Crank It Up
19	Lucio Battista	1:30.71	Crank It Up
20	Logan Kreglow	1:33.68	Crank It Up
21	Justin Andelin	1:38.90	Crank It Up
22	Anthony Eardley	1:38.98	Crank It Up
23	Ryan Rattazzi	1:53.23	Crank It Up
24	Ryan Lee	1:55.49	Crank It Up
25	Allyssa Beird	2:07.57	Crank It Up
26	Kevin Liang	2:19.80	Crank It Up
27	Julius Ferguson	0:45.32	Hazard Cones
28	Jonathan Stevens	0:49.79	Hazard Cones
29	Daniel Eiskant	0:57.44	Hazard Cones
30	Zach Day	1:03.06	Hazard Cones

Top 5 Women
Rank	Competitor	Time	Furthest Obstacle
1	Allyssa Beird	2:07.57	Crank It Up
2	Abby Clark	1:28.37	Hazard Cones
3	Angela Gargano	2:17.55	Hazard Cones
4	Karter Ohlson	0:23.07	Dangerous Curves
5	Cara Poalillo	0:28.72	Dangerous Curves

==== Finals ====
The Baltimore Finals featured one new obstacle, Angry Birds (which was done in promotion for The Angry Birds Movie 2). It took out 22 competitors, and nobody cleared it. This marked the first time in American Ninja Warrior history that no competitor made it past the eighth obstacle on a city finals course. This was also the first time in history that two city finals courses in one season concluded without any finishers and the fourth time that a city finals course was unfinished. Dave Cavanagh became only the second competitor to win both the Speed Pass and the Safety Pass.

Along with the Oriole Bird, the cheering section included the Baltimore Ravens cheerleaders and the team's mascot, Poe.

Top 13 Competitors
Rank	Competitor	Time	Furthest Obstacle
1	Dave Cavanagh	2:21.61	Angry Birds
2	Lucas Reale	2:46.65	Angry Birds
3	Najee Richardson	2:46.67	Angry Birds
4	Julius Ferguson	2:48.03	Angry Birds
5	Conor Galvin	2:48.60	Angry Birds
6	Anthony DeFranco	2:57.84	Angry Birds
7	Joe Moravsky	3:05.10	Angry Birds
8	Lucio Battista	3:05.30	Angry Birds
9	Branden Williams	3:14.12	Angry Birds
10	Chris Wilczewski	3:14.80	Angry Birds
11	Joe Capo	3:17.53	Angry Birds
12	Mike Silenzi	3:17.77	Angry Birds
13	Garrett Lam	3:18.37	Angry Birds

Top 2 Women
Rank	Competitor	Time	Furthest Obstacle
1	Allyssa Beird	5:18.20	Angry Birds
2	Karter Ohlson	1:34.69	Crank It Up

=== Cincinnati ===
==== Qualifying ====
The Cincinnati Qualifiers featured one new obstacle, the Slingshot. Among the crowd was Cincinnati Bengals quarterback Andy Dalton along with the team's cheerleading squad, the Cincinnati Ben–Gals, and the team's mascot, Who Dey. Also in the crowd were the Cincinnati Reds mascots, Mr. Red, Mr. Redlegs, and Rosie Red. Drew Lachey of the boy band 98 Degrees was among the celebrities who attempted this course.

Top 30 Competitors
Rank	Competitor	Time	Furthest Obstacle
1	Ethan Swanson	1:19.51	Finished
2	Jackson Twait	1:46.19	Finished
3	Cameron Baumgartner	1:55.38	Finished
4	Reese Pankratz	2:04.37	Finished
5	Dustin Rocho	2:35.52	Finished
6	Jesse Labreck	2:49.18	Finished
7	Mike Bernardo	3:05.11	Finished
8	Trevor West	3:17.49	Finished
9	Sem Garay	3:18.34	Finished
10	Michelle Warnky	3:54.67	Finished
11	**Grant McCartney**	4:29.24	Finished (Mega Wall)
12	Michael Torres	1:23.55	Mega Wall
13	Tyler Smith	1:23.87	Mega Wall
14	Jesse Maurer	2:28.82	Mega Wall
15	Chris DiGangi	0:52.09	Slingshot
16	Jonathan Cooley	1:00.17	Slingshot
17	David Womelsdorf	1:06.62	Slingshot
18	Jesse Wildman	1:09.35	Slingshot
19	Dan Polizzi	1:10.63	Slingshot
20	Derrick Pavoni	1:11.72	Slingshot
21	Mike Wright	1:16.71	Slingshot
22	Philip Scott	1:17.43	Slingshot
23	Zane Paski	1:19.19	Slingshot
24	Phillip Hucke	1:25.57	Slingshot
25	Brandon Mears	1:25.98	Slingshot
26	Eddie Russell	1:46.09	Slingshot
27	Christopher Gabayan	1:46.33	Slingshot
28	Cameron Nave	1:58.91	Slingshot
29	Amanda O'Dell	1:59.71	Slingshot
30	Jeri D'Aurelio	2:00.15	Slingshot

Top 5 Women
Rank	Competitor	Time	Furthest Obstacle
1	Jesse Labreck	2:49.18	Finished
2	Michelle Warnky	3:54.67	Finished
3	Amanda O'Dell	1:59.71	Slingshot
4	Jeri D'Aurelio	2:00.15	Slingshot
5	Jamie Ross	0:49.75	Spinning Bridge

==== Finals ====
The Cincinnati finals featured one new obstacle, Slam Dunk. In addition to the three Cincinnati Reds mascots, the University of Cincinnati cheerleaders, marching band, and university mascot Bearcat were on hand in the cheering section. This episode also featured a special guest appearance by legendary funk musician and Cincinnati native Bootsy Collins, who accompanied Grant McCartney to the starting line.

For the first time since the Dallas Finals in season 6, a woman completed the entire city finals course. The feat was accomplished by two women: Michelle Warnky and Jesse "Flex" Labreck.

Top 13 Competitors
Rank	Competitor	Time	Furthest Obstacle
1	Ethan Swanson	3:43.26	Finished
2	Michael Torres	4:01.20	Finished
3	Dan Polizzi	4:23.87	Finished
4	Brandon Mears	4:43.50	Finished
5	Chris DiGangi	5:53.60	Finished
6	Jesse Labreck	6:29.29	Finished
7	Michelle Warnky	7:03.26	Finished
8	Tyler Smith	2:32.86	Spinball Wizard
9	Philip Scott	3:20.92	Spinball Wizard
10	Trevor West	3:04.71	Slam Dunk
11	Grant McCartney	3:10.93	Slam Dunk
12	Sem Garay	3:38.00	Slam Dunk
13	Dustin Rocho	3:56.60	Slam Dunk

Top 2 Women
Rank	Competitor	Time	Furthest Obstacle
1	Jesse Labreck	6:29.29	Finished
2	Michelle Warnky	7:03.26	Finished

== City Qualifying Leaderboard ==
Bold denotes the finishers who completed the Mega Wall and received a prize money bonus ($10,000, $5,000, or $2,500 based on number of attempts).

Italics denote the Top 5 women who also finished in the overall Top 30.

Underline represents the contestant who won the Speed Pass on the Power Tower.

Top 180 Competitors
Rank	Competitor	Time	Furthest Obstacle
1	Leif Sundberg	0:58.75	Finished
2	Tyler Gillett	1:07.68	Finished
3	**Drew Drechsel**	1:08.32	Finished (Mega Wall)
4	Sean Bryan	1:14.37	Finished
5	R.J. Roman	1:16.90	Finished
6	Ethan Swanson	1:19.51	Finished
7	**Daniel Gil**	1:23.14	Finished (Mega Wall)
8	Jake Murray	1:25.37	Finished
9	Hunter Guerard	1:34.03	Finished
10	David Campbell	1:35.99	Finished
11	Kevin Bull	1:37.26	Finished
12	Lorin Ball	1:39.59	Finished
13	Jackson Twait	1:46.19	Finished
14	David Moonen	1:46.38	Finished
15	Matthew Day	1:50.12	Finished
16	Cameron Baumgartner	1:55.38	Finished
17	Nick Fordney	1:56.95	Finished
18	Ben Martin	1:59.60	Finished
19	**Caleb Bergstrom**	2:00.84	Finished (Mega Wall)
20	Dave Cavanagh	2:02.77	Finished
21	Reese Pankratz	2:04.37	Finished
22	Conor Galvin	2:07.02	Finished
23	Anthony DeFranco	2:07.38	Finished
24	Lucas Reale	2:12.85	Finished
25	Jody Freeman	2:12.99	Finished
26	**Karsten Williams**	2:13.82	Finished (Mega Wall)
27	Alex Hatch	2:15.07	Finished
28	Alex Blick	2:16.89	Finished
29	Brent Steffensen	2:17.67	Finished
30	**Kevin Carbone**	2:21.44	Finished (Mega Wall)
31	Travis Rosen	2:21.99	Finished
32	Danell Leyva	2:23.68	Finished
33	David Wright	2:26.98	Finished
34	Kenny Niemitalo	2:28.57	Finished
35	Davyon Hancox	2:28.93	Finished
36	Ben Wales	2:29.07	Finished
37	Brett Sims	2:33.79	Finished
38	Dustin Rocho	2:35.52	Finished
39	Jordon Hatton	2:37.05	Finished
40	**Scott Wilson**	2:41.25	Finished
41	Casey Suchocki	2:44.56	Finished
42	Jessie Graff	2:45.38	Finished
43	Scott Behrends	2:49.06	Finished
44	Jesse Labreck	2:49.18	Finished
45	Jeff Harris	2:51.79	Finished
46	Josiah Singleton	2:55.36	Finished
47	**Lance Pekus**	2:57.74	Finished (Mega Wall)
48	David Alvarez	2:59.71	Finished
49	Marquez Green	3:03.13	Finished
50	Kendall Ortez	3:05.10	Finished
51	Mike Bernardo	3:05.11	Finished
52	Jamie Rahn	3:08.56	Finished
53	Trevor West	3:17.49	Finished
54	Chris Howard	3:17.78	Finished
55	Sem Garay	3:18.34	Finished
56	Justin Gielski	3:18.51	Finished
57	**Ryan Stratis**	3:21.23	Finished (Mega Wall)
58	Roo Yori	3:27.91	Finished
59	Chad Hohn	3:33.36	Finished
60	Chris Talon Green	3:39.13	Finished
61	Arnold Hernandez	3:44.54	Finished
62	Brandon Stenta	3:45.18	Finished
63	Rochambeau Dolcine	3:50.88	Finished
64	Abel Gonzalez	3:51.64	Finished
65	Michelle Warnky	3:54.67	Finished
66	Brian Burk	3:58.38	Finished
67	Brandon McWilliams	4:03.91	Finished
68	Michael Silenzi	4:07.30	Finished
69	Garrett Lam	4:09.90	Finished
70	Brian Kretsch	4:17.67	Finished
71	**Grant McCartney**	4:29.24	Finished (Mega Wall)
72	Jonah Bonner	4:34.93	Finished
73	Sandy Zimmerman	4:44.15	Finished
74	Tyler Humphrey	5:01.84	Finished
75	Mathis Owhadi	1:10.37	Mega Wall
76	Kyle Soderman	1:10.67	Mega Wall
77	Jon Dilullo	1:20.83	Mega Wall
78	Michael Torres	1:23.55	Mega Wall
79	Tyler Smith	1:23.55	Mega Wall
80	Josh Kronberg	1:31.63	Mega Wall
81	Neil Craver	1:33.77	Mega Wall
82	Jody Avila	1:37.35	Mega Wall
83	Flip Rodriguez	1:40.77	Mega Wall
84	Josh Salinas	1:45.21	Mega Wall
85	Karson Voiles	1:45.66	Mega Wall
86	Ruben Arellano	1:49.46	Warped Wall
87	Brian Burkhardt	1:54.62	Mega Wall
88	Reko Rivera	2:02.11	Mega Wall
89	Dan Yager	2:07.76	Mega Wall
90	Bart Copeland	2:19.10	Mega Wall
91	Jesse Maurer	2:28.82	Mega Wall
92	Joe Moravsky	2:32.03	Mega Wall
93	Najee Richardson	2:43.47	Mega Wall
94	Chris Wilczewski	2:55.13	Mega Wall
95	Hunter Swan	3:05.34	Mega Wall
96	Cory McCoy	3:21.22	Warped Wall
97	Eddy Stewart	3:22.93	Warped Wall
98	Jessica Clayton	4:13.25	Warped Wall
99	Jackson Meyer	0:29.12	Lightning Bolts
100	Adam Rayl	0:38.17	Spin Hopper
101	Nick Hanson	0:45.34	Lightning Bolts
102	Seth Rogers	0:47.40	Spin Hopper
103	Nate Burkhalter	0:49.53	Lightning Bolts
104	Rainer Jundt	0:49.53	Lightning Bolts
105	Chris DiGangi	0:52.09	Slingshot
106	Jonathan Cooley	1:00.17	Slingshot
107	Matt Dolce	1:00.82	Lightning Bolts
108	Jonathan Horton	1:01.49	Coconut Climb
109	Joe Capobianco	1:02.09	Crank It Up
110	Travis Rust	1:02.73	Ferris Wheel
111	Kirill Rebkovets	1:03.10	Ferris Wheel
112	Rick Hinnant	1:06.40	Coconut Climb
113	David Womelsdorf	1:06.62	Slingshot
114	Josh Norton	1:07.31	Coconut Climb
115	Tristen Poffenberger	1:07.44	Crank It Up
116	Elliot Jolivette	1:07.80	Coconut Climb
117	Jesse Wildman	1:09.35	Slingshot
118	Dan Polizzi	1:10.93	Slingshot
119	Derek Pavoni	1:11.72	Slingshot
120	Ronald Washington	1:12.29	Ferris Wheel
121	Caleb Auer	1:12.37	Ferris Wheel
122	Brandon Varner	1:13.29	Lightning Bolts
123	Jeremy Taiwo	1:14.98	Lightning Bolts
124	Jonathan Bange	1:16.43	Coconut Climb
125	Mike Wright	1:16.71	Slingshot
126	Zack Scholes	1:17.07	Lightning Bolts
127	Ben Udy	1:17.18	Spin Hopper
128	Michael Larlee	1:17.21	Lightning Bolts
129	Phillip Scott	1:17.43	Slingshot
130	Gavin Maxwell	1:17.62	Lightning Bolts
131	Zane Paksi	1:19.19	Slingshot
132	Glenn Albright	1:19.58	Lightning Bolts
133	Alex Goodwin	1:19.63	Crank It Up
134	Sean Darling-Hammond	1:19.84	Lightning Bolts
135	Clayton Mirage	1:20.30	Crank It Up
136	Zach Barefoot	1:23.54	Crank It Up
137	Damir Okanovic	1:24.79	Coconut Climb
138	Phillip Hucke	1:25.57	Slingshot
139	Brandon Mears	1:25.98	Slingshot
140	Tremayne Dortch	1:27.39	Coconut Climb
141	Lucas Gomes	1:29.41	Ferris Wheel
142	Eli Bell	1:30.15	Crank It Up
143	Lucio Battista	1:30.71	Crank It Up
144	Ben Wilson	1:33.34	Ferris Wheel
145	Logan Kreglow	1:33.68	Crank It Up
146	Josh Harris	1:35.73	Coconut Climb
147	Westley Silvestri	1:37.57	Spin Hopper
148	Justin Andelin	1:38.90	Crank It Up
149	Anthony Eardley	1:38.98	Crank It Up
150	Glenn Davis	1:40.50	Ferris Wheel
151	Tyrone Poole	1:42.62	Ferris Wheel
152	Eddie Russell	1:46.09	Slingshot
153	Christopher Gabayan	1:46.33	Slingshot
154	Chris Cambre	1:48.01	Coconut Climb
155	Madelynn McNeal	1:50.14	Coconut Climb
156	Noah Garfield	1:52.39	Spin Hopper
157	Devin Harrelson	1:52.86	Ferris Wheel
158	Ryan Rattazzi	1:53.23	Crank It Up
159	Ryan Lee	1:55.49	Crank It Up
160	Cameron Nave	1:58.91	Slingshot
161	Austin Seibert	1:59.68	Spin Hopper
162	Amanda O'Dell	1:59.71	Slingshot
163	Jeri D'Aurelio	2:00.15	Slingshot
164	Maggi Thorne	2:01.17	Coconut Climb
165	Barclay Stockett	2:02.51	Coconut Climb
166	Taylor Amann	2:02.51	Coconut Climb
167	Samantha Bush	2:02.63	Spin Hopper
168	Allyssa Beird	2:07.57	Crank It Up
169	Kevin Liang	2:19.80	Crank It Up
170	Julius Ferguson	0:45.32	Hazard Cones
171	Jonathan Stevens	0:49.79	Hazard Cones
172	Kevin Fisch	0:56.12	Diamond Dash
173	Daniel Eiskant	0:57.74	Hazard Cones
174	Zach Day	1:03.06	Hazard Cones
175	Rebekah Bonilla	1:24.29	Diamond Dash
176	Verdale Benson	1:28.43	Diamond Dash
177	Lee Cates	0:17.03	Spring Forward
178	Thomas Kofron	0:19.06	Spring Forward
179	Anthony Trucks	0:26.56	Spring Forward
180	Steven Barbarito	0:29.96	Spring Forward

Top 30 Women
Rank	Competitor	Time	Furthest Obstacle
1	Jessie Graff	2:45.38	Finished
2	Jesse Labreck	2:49.18	Finished
3	Michelle Warnky	3:54.67	Finished
4	Sandy Zimmerman	4:44.15	Finished
5	Jessica Clayton	4:13.25	Warped Wall
6	Mady Howard	1:25.26	Lightning Bolts
7	Christi Marie	1:37.36	Lightning Bolts
8	Madelynn McNeal	1:50.14	Coconut Climb
9	Meagan Martin	1:50.19	Lightning Bolts
10	Alyssa Varsalona	1:54.07	Ferris Wheel
11	Amanda O'Dell	1:59.71	Slingshot
12	Jeri D'Aurelio	2:00.15	Slingshot
13	Maggi Thorne	2:01.17	Coconut Climb
14	Barclay Stockett	2:02.51	Coconut Climb
15	Taylor Amann	2:02.51	Coconut Climb
16	Samantha Bush	2:02.63	Spin Hopper
17	Allyssa Beird	2:07.57	Crank It Up
18	Karen Wiltin	3:29.12	Coconut Climb
19	Emily Durham	0:45.92	Bouncing Spider
20	Caitlyn Bergstrom	1:00.63	Bouncing Spider
21	Grace Sims	1:12.86	Bouncing Spider
22	Rebekah Bonilla	1:24.29	Diamond Dash
23	Abby Clark	1:28.37	Hazard Cones
24	Angela Gargano	2:17.55	Hazard Cones
25	Karter Ohlson	0:23.07	Dangerous Curves
26	Cara Poalillo	0:28.72	Dangerous Curves
27	Jamie Ross	0:49.75	Spinning Bridge
28	Emmi Rose	N/A	Spring Forward
29	Anna Shumaker	N/A	Walk the Plank
30	Tiana Webberley	N/A	Walk the Plank

== City Finals Leaderboard ==
Italics denote the Top 2 women who also finished in the overall Top 13.

Underline represents the contestant who won the Speed Pass on the Power Tower in qualifying.

Green represents the contestant who won the Safety Pass on the Power Tower.

Top 78 Competitors
Rank	Competitor	Time	Furthest Obstacle
1	Daniel Gil	3:34.23	Finished
2	Drew Drechsel	3:37.79	Finished
3	Ethan Swanson	3:43.36	Finished
4	Michael Torres	4:01.20	Finished
5	Flip Rodriguez	4:13.48	Finished
6	Dan Polizzi	4:23.87	Finished
7	Mathis Owhadi	4:28.83	Finished
8	Karsten Williams	4:29.17	Finished
9	Brandon Mears	4:43.50	Finished
10	Kevin Carbone	4:50.15	Finished
11	Jody Avila	5:11.20	Finished
12	David Wright	5:17.38	Finished
13	Brian Kretsch	5:42.71	Finished
14	Tyler Gillett	5:47.79	Finished
15	Chris DiGangi	5:53.60	Finished
16	Jesse Labreck	6:29.29	Finished
17	Michelle Warnky	7:03.26	Finished
18	Brett Sims	7:10.40	Finished
19	Ryan Stratis	8:42.98	Finished
20	R.J. Roman	3:43.93	Spider Trap
21	Jody Freeman	4:18.56	Spider Trap
22	Kenny Niemitalo	4:26.88	Spider Trap
23	Hunter Guerard	N/A	Leaps of Faith
24	Tyler Smith	2:32.86	Spinball Wizard
25	Kevin Bull	2:35.59	Leaps of Faith
26	Danell Leyva	N/A	Leaps of Faith
27	David Campbell	N/A	Leaps of Faith
28	Scott Wilson	N/A	Leaps of Faith
29	Adam Rayl	N/A	Leaps of Faith
30	Seth Rogers	N/A	Leaps of Faith
31	Ben Udy	N/A	Leaps of Faith
32	Brian Burk	N/A	Leaps of Faith
33	Hunter Swan	N/A	Leaps of Faith
34	Verdale Benson	N/A	Leaps of Faith
35	Jeff Harris	2:54.03	Snap Back
36	Brian Burkhardt	3:04.31	Snap Back
37	Nick Fordney	3:04.83	Snap Back
38	Josh Salinas	3:04.97	Snap Back
39	Ben Wales	3:08.85	Snap Back
40	Caleb Auer	3:16.04	Fallout
41	Dan Yager	3:17.32	Northwest Passage
42	Phillip Scott	3:20.92	Spinball Wizard
43	Alex Blick	3:21.94	Snap Back
44	Karson Voiles	3:25.20	Northwest Passage
45	Jessie Graff	4:34.00	Northwest Passage
46	Kendall Ortez	2:03.90	Crazy Clocks
47	Caleb Bergstrom	2:16.09	Up for Grabs
48	Lorin Ball	2:18.36	Floating Monkey Bars
49	Sean Bryan	2:20.20	Floating Monkey Bars
50	Dave Cavanagh	2:21.61	Angry Birds
51	Damir Okanovic	2:24.88	Crazy Clocks
52	David Moonen	2:28.85	Floating Monkey Bars
53	Ronald Washington	2:36.36	Up for Grabs
54	Matt Dolce	2:44.35	Floating Monkey Bars
55	Zack Scholes	2:45.55	Floating Monkey Bars
56	Lucas Reale	2:46.65	Angry Birds
57	Najee Richardson	2:46.67	Angry Birds
58	Julius Ferguson	2:48.00	Angry Birds
59	Conor Galvin	2:48.60	Angry Birds
60	Travis Rosen	2:50.35	Up for Grabs
61	Mady Howard	2:55.42	Floating Monkey Bars
62	Anthony DeFranco	2:57.84	Angry Birds
63	Trevor West	3:04.71	Slam Dunk
64	Joe Moravsky	3:05.10	Angry Birds
65	Lucio Battista	3:05.30	Angry Birds
66	Casey Suchocki	3:05.58	Up for Grabs
67	Grant McCartney	3:10.93	Slam Dunk
68	Brandon McWilliams	3:14.12	Angry Birds
69	Scott Behrends	3:14.40	Floating Monkey Bars
70	Chris Wilczewski	3:14.80	Angry Birds
71	Nate Burkhalter	3:15.52	Floating Monkey Bars
72	Joe Capobianco	3:17.53	Angry Birds
73	Michael Silenzi	3:17.77	Angry Birds
74	Garrett Lam	3:18.37	Angry Birds
75	Nick Hanson	3:20.83	Floating Monkey Bars
76	Sem Garay	3:38.00	Slam Dunk
77	Dustin Rocho	3:56.60	Slam Dunk
78	Sean Darling-Hammond	4:01.23	Floating Monkey Bars

Top 12 Women
Rank	Competitor	Time	Furthest Obstacle
1	Jesse Labreck	6:29.29	Finished
2	Michelle Warnky	7:03.26	Finished
3	Jessie Graff	4:34.00	Northwest Passage
4	Mady Howard	2:55.42	Floating Monkey Bars
5	Taylor Amann	4:13.30	Crazy Clocks
6	Barclay Stockett	4:35.84	Crazy Clocks
7	Allyssa Beird	5:18.20	Angry Birds
8	Tiana Webberley	N/A	The Hinge
9	Anna Shumaker	N/A	Warped Wall
10	Caitlyn Bergstrom	N/A	Ferris Wheel
11	Karter Ohlson	N/A	Crank It Up
12	Jessica Clayton	N/A	Bouncing Spider

== National Finals ==
=== Stage 1 ===
Stage 1 featured one new obstacle, Spin Your Wheels.

Table key
Key	Description
	Run aired on Night 1
	Run aired on Night 2

Stage 1 Finishers
Rank	Competitor	Time
1	Mathis Owhadi	Finished (1:38.22)
2	Ethan Swanson	Finished (1:48.73)
3	Daniel Gil	Finished (1:49.46)
4	Adam Rayl	Finished (1:52.24)
5	Tyler Smith	Finished (1:53.19)
6	Josh Salinas	Finished (1:57.95)
7	Lucas Reale	Finished (2:01.03)
8	Tyler Gillett	Finished (2:02.45)
9	Drew Drechsel	Finished (2:09.75) (Safety Pass)
10	Joe Moravsky	Finished (2:10.19)
11	Kevin Carbone	Finished (2:11.14)
12	Michael Torres	Finished (2:12.32)
13	Hunter Guerard	Finished (2:12.70)
14	Dave Cavanagh	Finished (2:14.57)
15	Flip Rodriguez	Finished (2:16.37) (Safety Pass)
16	Alex Blick	Finished (2:18.42)
17	Nate Burkhalter	Finished (2:18.99)
18	Ben Wales	Finished (2:19.78)
19	Karsten Williams	Finished (2:19.92)
20	Ryan Stratis	Finished (2:20.34)
21	Chris DiGangi	Finished (2:21.90)
22	R.J. Roman	Finished (2:22.05)
23	Dan Polizzi	Finished (2:22.15)
24	Seth Rogers	Finished (2:22.60)
25	Grant McCartney	Finished (2:23.44)
26	Karson Voiles	Finished (2:24.41)
27	Lorin Ball	Finished (2:25.27)
28	Casey Suchocki	Finished (2:25.66)

NOTE: Drew Drechsel failed on the fifth obstacle, Tire Run, and used his Safety Pass from winning his regional to retry the course a second time, as did Flip Rodriguez on the seventh obstacle on Stage 1, the Diving Boards. Both completed the course on their 2nd attempt.

NOTE: For the second season in a row no women completed Stage 1.

=== Stage 2 ===
Stage 2 featured three new obstacles, Giant Walk the Plank, the Extension Salmon Ladder and the Grim Sweeper. A record-number 21 competitors completed Stage 2.

Competitor	Result
Daniel Gil	Finished (1:54.43)
Josh Salinas	Finished (1:56.20)
Tyler Smith	Finished (1:57.33)
Ethan Swanson	Finished (2:05.40)
Joe Moravsky	Finished (2:11.93)
Karsten Williams	Finished (2:23.62)
Tyler Gillett	Finished (2:23.68)
Drew Drechsel	Finished (2:24.66)
Kevin Carbone	Finished (2:28.44)
Adam Rayl	Finished (2:29.20)
Hunter Guerard	Finished (2:31.06)
Chris DiGangi	Finished (2:31.64)
Casey Suchocki	Finished (2:35.97)
Lucas Reale	Finished (2:36.27)
Ryan Stratis	Finished (2:43.69)
Seth Rogers	Finished (2:44.73)
Michael Torres	Finished (2:48.14)
R.J. Roman	Finished (2:48.19)
Mathis Owhadi	Finished (2:48.47) (Safety Pass)
Karson Voiles	Finished (2:50.28) (Safety Pass)
Nate Burkhalter	Finished (2:58.04)
Flip Rodriguez	Failed on Water Walls (Timed out)
Lorin Ball	Failed on Swing Surfer
Alex Blick	Failed on Swing Surfer
Dan Polizzi	Failed on Snap Back
Dave Cavanagh	Failed on Extension Ladder (Safety Pass)
Grant McCartney	Failed on Extension Ladder
Ben Wales	Failed on Giant Walk the Plank

NOTE: Kid Owhadi failed on the Grim Sweeper (the fifth obstacle) and used his Safety Pass to retry and finish the course. Karson Voiles failed on Snap Back (the third obstacle) and also used his safety pass to retry and finish the course. Dave Cavanagh failed on Giant Walk the Plank and used the Safety Pass, but fell again on the Extension Ladder, so he was the only Ninja who had played the Safety Pass on Stage 2 to not move on to Stage 3.

=== Stage 3 ===
Stage 3 featured three new obstacles, Grip & Tip, Iron Summit and Pipe Dream.

Competitor	Result	Notes
Ryan Stratis	2. Iron Summit	Fell on descent.
Michael Torres	4. Ultimate Cliffhanger	Failed dismount.
Chris DiGangi	4. Ultimate Cliffhanger	Digest. Leap across.
Ethan Swanson	4. Ultimate Cliffhanger	Lost grip on final ledge.
Hunter Guerard	4. Ultimate Cliffhanger	Digest. Lost grip on final ledge.
Lucas Reale	5. Pipe Dream	Fell in second set of poles.
Joe Moravsky	6. Cane Lane	Transition to final rail.
R.J. Roman	2. Iron Summit	Digest. Transition to second side.
Drew Drechsel	Finish	Third competitor to finish Stage 3.
Tyler Gillett	6. Cane Lane	Digest. First jump.
Karsten Williams	5. Pipe Dream	Fell on first set of poles.
Tyler Smith	5. Pipe Dream	Digest. Fell on first dropping pole.
Seth Rogers	6. Cane Lane	First jump.
Nate Burkhalter	2. Iron Summit	Digest. Failed ascent.
Casey Suchocki	4. Ultimate Cliffhanger	Digest. Leap across.
Kevin Carbone	6. Cane Lane	Digest. Lost grip on second rail.
Mathis Owhadi	4. Ultimate Cliffhanger	Transition to final ledge.
Karson Voiles	6. Cane Lane	Digest. Lost grip on second rail.
Adam Rayl	6. Cane Lane	Failed transition to resting bar.
Josh Salinas	1. Grip & Tip	Transition to second cylinder.
Daniel Gil	Finish	Fourth competitor to finish Stage 3.

==== Leaderboard ====
Order	Finalist	Outcome
1	Daniel Gil	Finished (7:35.13)
2	Drew Drechsel	Finished (7:36.95)

=== Stage 4 ===
Order	Finalist	Result	Notes
1	Drew Drechsel	Total Victory	0:27.46
2	Daniel Gil	Timed Out	70 ft up.

== Ratings ==
Episode		Air date	Timeslot (ET)	Rating/Share (18–49)		Viewers (millions)	DVR (18–49)	DVR Viewers (millions)	Total (18–49)	Total Viewers
1	"Los Angeles City Qualifiers"	May 29, 2019	Wednesday 8:00 p.m.	1.0	5	4.84	0.3	0.90	1.3	5.73
2	"Atlanta City Qualifiers"	June 5, 2019	Wednesday 8:00 p.m.	0.9	5	4.35	0.2	0.86	1.1	5.22
3	"Oklahoma City City Qualifiers"	June 17, 2019	Monday 8:00 p.m.	0.9	5	4.79	0.2	0.80	1.1	5.59
4	"Seattle/Tacoma City Qualifiers"	June 24, 2019	Monday 8:00 p.m.	0.8	4	4.67	TBA	TBA	TBA	TBA
5	"Baltimore City Qualifiers"	July 1, 2019	Monday 8:00 p.m.	0.8	4	4.75	TBA	TBA	TBA	TBA
6	"Cincinnati City Qualifiers"	July 8, 2019	Monday 8:00 p.m.	0.9	4	4.49	TBA	TBA	TBA	TBA
7	"Los Angeles City Finals"	July 15, 2019	Monday 8:00 p.m.	0.9	4	4.54	TBA	TBA	TBA	TBA
8	"Atlanta City Finals"	July 22, 2019	Monday 8:00 p.m.	0.8	5	4.74	TBA	TBA	TBA	TBA
9	"Oklahoma City Finals"	July 29, 2019	Monday 8:00 p.m.	0.8	4	4.66	TBA	TBA	TBA	TBA
10	"Seattle/Tacoma City Finals"	August 5, 2019	Monday 8:00 p.m.	0.8	4	4.63	TBA	TBA	TBA	TBA
11	"Baltimore City Finals"	August 12, 2019	Monday 8:00 p.m.	0.9	4	4.76	TBA	TBA	TBA	TBA
12	"Cincinnati City Finals"	August 19, 2019	Monday 8:00 p.m.	0.8	4	4.46	TBA	TBA	TBA	TBA
13	"National Finals Night 1"	August 26, 2019	Monday 8:00 p.m.	0.9	4	4.90	TBA	TBA	TBA	TBA
14	"National Finals Night 2"	September 2, 2019	Monday 8:00 p.m.	0.8	4	4.47	TBA	TBA	TBA	TBA
15	"National Finals Night 3"	September 9, 2019	Monday 8:00 p.m.	0.8	4	4.63	TBA	TBA	TBA	TBA
16	"National Finals Night 4"	September 16, 2019	Monday 8:00 p.m.	1.0	5	4.93	TBA	TBA	TBA	TBA
