= American Ninja Warrior season 10 =

Season of American reality/sport competition television series American Ninja Warrior

American Ninja Warrior
- Season 10
- Hosted by: Matt Iseman; Akbar Gbaja-Biamila; Kristine Leahy
- Finals venue: Las Vegas, NV
- No. of episodes: 15

Release
- Original network: NBC
- Original release: May 30 – September 10, 2018

Season chronology
- ← Previous; Season 9 Next → Season 11

The tenth season of American Ninja Warrior premiered on May 30, 2018 on NBC. Hosts Matt Iseman and Akbar Gbaja-Biamila returned for their ninth and sixth seasons, respectively, alongside sideline reporter Kristine Leahy who returns for her fourth. Prior to the season premiere, NBC aired two special episodes. On May 17, 2018, a two-hour All-Stars special aired, while on May 24, 2018, the second annual Celebrity Ninja Warrior for Red Nose Day featured celebrities raising money for charity.

Changes this season included the introduction of the 18-foot (5.5 m) "Mega Wall". It was next to the original 14'6" (4.4 m) warped wall, and gave competitors the choice of which to climb. Competitors who chose the Mega Wall had only one attempt to reach the top, and if successful, would win $10,000. If unsuccessful, the competitor would only get one shot at the warped wall. Those who did not wish to attempt the Mega Wall had three chances to reach the top of the warped wall. The Mega Wall was only in play during the city qualifying. In addition, the age limit was lowered down from 21 in all previous seasons to 19 this season. The "Last Ninja Standing", the competitor who goes the farthest in the finals, if no one completes Stage 4, would now receive $100,000.

Season 7 champion Isaac Caldiero participated and finished the Indianapolis qualifiers, marking his return to competition in the series. He would later fall in the city finals, marking the end of his season as he fell at Block Run.

== Competition schedule ==
Qualifying airing	Finals airing	City	Episode taping	Venue
June 6, 2018	July 16, 2018	Los Angeles, California	March 6–7, 2018	Universal Studios Hollywood
May 30, 2018	July 23, 2018	Dallas, Texas	March 25–26, 2018	Fair Park
June 13, 2018	July 30, 2018	Miami, Florida	April 13–14, 2018	Bayfront Park
June 18, 2018	August 6, 2018	Indianapolis, Indiana	April 29–30, 2018	Monument Circle
June 25, 2018	August 13, 2018	Philadelphia, Pennsylvania	May 11–12, 2018	Richmond Power Plant
July 9, 2018	August 20, 2018	Minneapolis, Minnesota	May 25–26, 2018	U.S. Bank Stadium

== Obstacles ==
=== City Qualifying & Finals ===
Indicates obstacles created by fans for the "American Ninja Warrior Obstacle Design Challenge".

Event		Obstacles										Finishers
Los Angeles	Qualifying	Floating Steps	Jumper Cables	Spinning Bridge	Sky Hooks	Doorknob Drop	Warped Wall/Mega Wall	N/A				10
Los Angeles	Finals	Archer Steps	Jumper Cables	Spinning Bridge	Flying Shelf Grab	Doorknob Drop	Warped Wall	Salmon Ladder	Giant Cubes	Baton Pass	Spider Trap	9
Dallas	Qualifying	Floating Steps	Catch & Release	Bouncing Spider	Tuning Forks	Crank It Up	Warped Wall/Mega Wall	N/A				13
Dallas	Finals	Archer Steps	Catch & Release	Bouncing Spider	Broken Bridge	Crank It Up	Warped Wall	Salmon Ladder	Nail Clipper	Fallout	Spider Trap	5
Miami	Qualifying	Floating Steps	Fly Wheels	Razor's Edge	Ring Turn	Slippery Summit	Warped Wall/Mega Wall	N/A				11
Miami	Finals	Archer Steps	Cannonball Drop	Razor's Edge	Ring Turn	Slippery Summit	Warped Wall	Salmon Ladder	Crazy Clocks	Stair Hopper	Spider Trap	3
Indianapolis	Qualifying	Floating Steps	Cannonball Drop	Wheel Flip	Block Run	Spin Hopper	Warped Wall/Mega Wall	N/A				10
Indianapolis	Finals	Archer Steps	Fly Wheels	Wheel Flip	Block Run	Spin Hopper	Warped Wall	Salmon Ladder	The Clacker	Cane Lane	Spider Trap	3
Philadelphia	Qualifying	Floating Steps	Spinning Bowties	Broken Bridge	Wingnuts	Lightning Bolts	Warped Wall/Mega Wall	N/A				12
Philadelphia	Finals	Archer Steps	Spinning Bowties	Broken Bridge	Wingnuts	Lightning Bolts	Warped Wall	Salmon Ladder	Captain's Wheel	Spinball Wizard	Spider Trap	3
Minneapolis	Qualifying	Floating Steps	Double Twister	Ring Jump	Diamond Dash	Battering Ram	Warped Wall/Mega Wall	N/A				14
Minneapolis	Finals	Archer Steps	Double Twister	Sky Hooks	Diamond Dash	Battering Ram	Warped Wall	Salmon Ladder	The Hinge	Iron Maiden	Spider Trap	5

=== National Finals ===
Event	Obstacle(s)								Finishers
Stage 1	Archer Alley	Propeller Bar	Double Dipper	Jumping Spider	Jeep Run	Warped Wall	Razor Beams	Twist & Fly	30
Stage 2	Epic Catch & Release	Criss Cross Salmon Ladder	Deja Vu	Swing Surfer	Wingnut Alley	Water Walls	N/A		2
Stage 3	Floating Boards	En Garde	Crazy Clocks	Ultimate Cliffhanger	Curved Body Prop	Peg Cloud	Cane Lane	Flying Bar	0
Stage 4	Rope Climb								N/A

== City courses ==
Bold denotes the finishers who completed the Mega Wall and received a $10,000 bonus.
Italics denote the Top 5 women who also finished in the overall Top 30.

=== Los Angeles ===
==== Qualifying ====
A "Jurassic World Night"-themed course was present during the episode. It featured Jurassic World-like decorations and dinosaurs. This was to promote the upcoming action-thriller movie Jurassic World: Fallen Kingdom. Actors Chris Pratt and Bryce Dallas Howard both made special appearances. The course featured two new obstacles, the Jumper Cables and Doorknob Drop.

Bold denotes the finishers who completed the Mega Wall and received a $10,000 bonus.
Italics denote the Top 5 women who also finished in the overall Top 30.

Top 30 Competitors
Rank	Competitor	Time	Furthest Obstacle
1	Brian Rambo	2:26.54	Finished
2	Nicholas Coolridge	3:07.73	Finished
3	Thomas Kofron	3:10.56	Finished
4	Josh Levin	3:11.40	Finished
5	**Adam Rayl**	3:12.46	Finished (Mega Wall)
6	Spencer Clapp	3:47.86	Finished
7	Sean Bryan	3:56.84	Finished
8	David Campbell	4:49.98	Finished
9	**Nick Hanson**	5:07.97	Finished (Mega Wall)
10	Brian Kretsch	6:07.67	Finished
11	Kevin Bull	0:45.65	Doorknob Drop
12	Jesse Orenshein	1:05.63	Doorknob Drop
13	Flip Rodriguez	1:08.92	Doorknob Drop
14	Scott Willson	1:14.77	Doorknob Drop
15	Jeremy Rivette	1:16.57	Doorknob Drop
16	Davyon Hancox	1:16.88	Doorknob Drop
17	Derek Miyamoto	1:22.44	Doorknob Drop
18	Anthony Trucks	1:28.34	Doorknob Drop
19	Tiana Webberley	1:30.81	Doorknob Drop
20	Tylor Schlorf	1:35.61	Doorknob Drop
21	Joe Mardovich	1:35.94	Doorknob Drop
22	Brock Taylor	1:36.57	Doorknob Drop
23	Grant McCartney	1:38.89	Doorknob Drop
24	Austin Seibert	1:39.00	Doorknob Drop
25	Ruben Arellano	1:40.92	Doorknob Drop
26	Gabe Hurtado	1:41.88	Doorknob Drop
27	Verdale Benson	1:43.27	Doorknob Drop
28	Eric Nelson	1:43.28	Doorknob Drop
29	Westley Silverstri	1:47.28	Doorknob Drop
30	Brian Neal	1:52.82	Doorknob Drop

Top 5 Women
Rank	Competitor	Time	Furthest Obstacle
1	Tiana Webberley	1:30.81	Doorknob Drop
2	Zhanique Lovett	2:04.76	Doorknob Drop
3	Selena Laniel	2:38.74	Doorknob Drop
4	Anna Shumaker	3:08.26	Doorknob Drop
5	Samantha Bush	1:27.62	Sky Hooks

==== Finals ====
The Los Angeles Finals were the first finals to air this season and introduced some new changes to the Finals competition. Unlike past seasons, two of the original 6 obstacles were replaced for the finals, in this case, the Archer Steps (a new obstacle) replaced the Floating Steps, and the Flying Shelf Grab replaced the Sky Hooks. This course consisted of two new obstacles on the back half: the Baton Pass and the new finals closer, the Spider Trap.

Top 15 Competitors
Rank	Competitor	Time	Furthest Obstacle
1	Sean Bryan	6:09.99	Finished
2	Nicholas Coolridge	6:10.92	Finished
3	Josh Levin	6:21.84	Finished
4	Kevin Bull	6:31.31	Finished
5	Brian Rambo	6:33.63	Finished
6	Adam Rayl	6:37.39	Finished
7	Flip Rodriguez	6:38.17	Finished
8	David Campbell	7:01.27	Finished
9	Derek Miyamoto	8:10.39	Finished
10	Spencer Clapp	6:27.21	Spider Trap
11	Thomas Kofron	4:58.34	Baton Pass
12	Nick Hanson	5:28.83	Baton Pass
13	Eric Nelson	5:43.21	Baton Pass
14	Davyon Hancox	5:56.56	Baton Pass
15	Brian Kretsch	6:01.69	Baton Pass

Top 2 Women
Rank	Competitor	Time	Furthest Obstacle
1	Tiana Webberley	6:58.53	Baton Pass
2	Anna Shumaker	5:36.86	Giant Cubes

=== Dallas ===
==== Qualifying ====
The Dallas Qualifying featured two new obstacles, the Catch & Release and the Tuning Forks. The Mega Wall was also introduced.

Bold denotes the finishers who completed the Mega Wall and received a $10,000 bonus.
Italics denote the Top 5 women who also finished in the overall Top 30.

Top 30 Competitors
Rank	Competitor	Time	Furthest Obstacle
1	**Daniel Gil**	1:40.79	Finished (Mega Wall)
2	Matthew Day	2:09.62	Finished
3	Josh Salinas	2:21.30	Finished
4	Mathis "Kid" Owhadi	2:36.58	Finished
5	Thomas Stillings	2:38.88	Finished
6	Jeremiah Morgan	2:41.27	Finished
7	Andrew Swinghamer	3:27.14	Finished
8	Abel Gonzalez	3:52.26	Finished
9	Tyler Humphrey	4:12.67	Finished
10	Kevin Jordan	4:29.18	Finished
11	Tremayne Dortch	4:38.73	Finished
12	Mike Murray	4:45.67	Finished
13	Jon Stewart	5:43.61	Finished
14	Venn Johns	3:48.00	Warped Wall
15	Andrew Lowes	1:20.86	Crank It Up
16	Nate Burkhalter	1:27.47	Crank It Up
17	Steven Tucker	1:46.56	Crank It Up
18	Chris Cambre	1:48.26	Crank It Up
19	Josh Norton	1:48.98	Crank It Up
20	Adam Ster	2:07.13	Crank It Up
21	Dylan Lancaster	2:30.18	Crank It Up
22	Victor Gonzalez	2:33.18	Crank It Up
23	Louis Moore	2:52.04	Crank It Up
24	Erik Brown	3:06.43	Crank It Up
25	Karen Wiltin	3:48.91	Crank It Up
26	Quest O'Neal	3:57.48	Crank It Up
27	Karsten Williams	0:42.40	Tuning Forks
28	Brent Steffensen	0:49.52	Tuning Forks
29	Brian Burkhardt	0:52.20	Tuning Forks
30	Elliott Jolivette	0:56.60	Tuning Forks

Top 5 Women
Rank	Competitor	Time	Furthest Obstacle
1	Karen Wiltin	3:48.91	Crank It Up
2	Quest O'Neal	3:57.48	Crank It Up
3	Barclay Stockett	1:30.32	Tuning Forks
4	Brittany Hanks	2:05.65	Tuning Forks
5	Kat Ratcliff	0:48.73	Bouncing Spider

==== Finals ====
The Dallas Finals replaced the first and fourth obstacles with the Archer Steps and the Broken Bridge respectively. The back half of the ANW course featured the new themed obstacle called Fallout which is inspired by action stunts from the film, Mission: Impossible – Fallout.

Top 15 Competitors
Rank	Competitor	Time	Furthest Obstacle
1	Daniel Gil	3:54.73	Finished
2	Matthew Day	4:37.10	Finished
3	Josh Salinas	4:38.49	Finished
4	Jeremiah Morgan	5:16.53	Finished
5	Mathis "Kid" Owhadi	5:37.17	Finished
6	Thomas Stillings	3:06.96	Fallout
7	Abel Gonzalez	3:31:85	Fallout
8	Brian Burkhardt	1:40.86	Nail Clipper
9	Elliott Jolivette	2:24.68	Nail Clipper
10	Karsten Williams	2:27.76	Nail Clipper
11	Andrew Swinghamer	2:33.66	Nail Clipper
12	Mike Murray	2:48.77	Nail Clipper
13	Brent Steffensen	2:50.72	Nail Clipper
14	Josh Norton	4:03.23	Nail Clipper
15	Kevin Jordan	4:10.84	Nail Clipper

Top 2 Women
Rank	Competitor	Time	Furthest Obstacle
1	Barclay Stockett	4:25.20	Nail Clipper
2	Brittany Hanks	1:55.96	Broken Bridge

=== Miami ===
==== Qualifying ====
In attendance were University of Miami cheerleaders and the university mascot Sebastian the Ibis, along with 3-time NFL All-Pro Jevon Kearse, and "Ninjatron", a 10-foot homemade ninja robot costume made by competitor Jesse Johnson. The Miami Qualifying featured two new obstacles, the Ring Turn and Slippery Summit.

Bold denotes the finishers who completed the Mega Wall and received a $10,000 bonus.
Italics denote the Top 5 women who also finished in the overall Top 30.

Top 30 Competitors
Rank	Competitor	Time	Furthest Obstacle
1	Drew Drechsel	2:24.74	Finished
2	Kenny Niemitalo	3:36.33	Finished
3	Calle Alexander	3:56.18	Finished
4	Brett Sims	4:07.95	Finished
5	Neil Craver	4:10.87	Finished
6	**Ryan Stratis**	4:20.44	Finished (Mega Wall)
7	Eddy Stewart	4:25.41	Finished
8	Nick Patel	4:33.39	Finished
9	Bootie Cothran	4:53.73	Finished
10	Jessie Graff	4:57.43	Finished
11	Morgan Wright	5:04.81	Finished
12	Kevin Carbone	1:37.90	Slippery Summit
13	Todd Bourgeois	1:51.22	Slippery Summit
14	R.J. Roman	1:51.38	Slippery Summit
15	Eli Bell	1:53.42	Slippery Summit
16	Drew Hendry	1:59.93	Slippery Summit
17	Doug Legg	2:06.31	Slippery Summit
18	Casey Suchocki	2:08.76	Slippery Summit
19	Jason Bergstrom	2:19.57	Slippery Summit
20	Greg Manders	2:32.16	Slippery Summit
21	Ethan Surprenant	2:33.21	Slippery Summit
22	Jordan Brown	2:33.28	Slippery Summit
23	Nico Long	2:41.80	Slippery Summit
24	Rachael Goldstein	2:47.80	Slippery Summit
25	Oscar Ramirez	2:48.02	Slippery Summit
26	Lindsay Eskildsen	2:54.12	Slippery Summit
27	Reko Rivera	3:01.65	Slippery Summit
28	Devin Harrelson	3:02.57	Slippery Summit
29	Scott Reuter	3:07.91	Slippery Summit
30	Michael Johnson	3:15.36	Slippery Summit

Top 5 Women
Rank	Competitor	Time	Furthest Obstacle
1	Jessie Graff	4:57.43	Finished
2	Rachael Goldstein	2:47.80	Slippery Summit
3	Lindsay Eskildsen	2:54.12	Slippery Summit
4	Jessica Clayton	3:19.74	Slippery Summit
5	Emily Durham	1:14.60	Ring Turn

==== Finals ====
In attendance yet again were University of Miami cheerleaders and the university mascot Sebastian the Ibis. The Miami Finals replaced the Floating Steps with the Archer Steps, the Fly Wheels with Cannonball Drop, as well as added a new obstacle to the back half, the Crazy Clocks.

Italics denote the Top 2 women who also finished in the overall Top 15.

Top 15 Competitors
Rank	Competitor	Time	Furthest Obstacle
1	Kenny Niemetalo	7:41.90	Finished
2	Brett Sims	7:42.76	Finished
3	Ryan Stratis	8:25.63	Finished
4	Drew Drechsel	3:56.75	Stair Hopper
5	Jessie Graff	5:32.60	Stair Hopper
6	Michael Johnson	3:26.25	Crazy Clocks
7	Casey Suchocki	3:32.99	Crazy Clocks
8	Todd Bourgeois	4:05.74	Crazy Clocks
9	Nick Patel	4:21.10	Crazy Clocks
10	Neil Craver	4:55.57	Crazy Clocks
11	R.J. Roman	5:02.32	Crazy Clocks
12	Drew Hendry	5:19.58	Crazy Clocks
13	Bootie Cothran	5:35.24	Crazy Clocks
14	Rachael Goldstein	5:37.50	Crazy Clocks
15	Reko Rivera	2:27.14	Salmon Ladder

Top 2 Women
Rank	Competitor	Time	Furthest Obstacle
1	Jessie Graff	5:32.60	Stair Hopper
2	Rachael Goldstein	5:37.50	Crazy Clocks

=== Indianapolis ===
==== Qualifying ====
The Indianapolis Qualifying marked the return of the only winner of American Ninja Warrior; bus boy and rock climber, Isaac Caldiero who achieved "total victory" three seasons ago. U.S. Women's Hockey Olympic Gold medalist Kendall Coyne and IndyCar racer and 2008 Indianapolis 500 champ Scott Dixon ran the course which was held at the historic Monument Circle. In attendance was the Indianapolis Colts cheerleaders and their mascot "Blue", as well as the University of Indiana cheerleaders. The Indianapolis Qualifying featured two new obstacles, the Wheel Flip and Spin Hopper. No finishers were able to conquer the Mega Wall.

Italics denote the Top 5 women who also finished in the overall Top 30.

Top 30 Competitors
Rank	Competitor	Time	Furthest Obstacle
1	Michael Bougher	2:29.54	Finished
2	Dan Polizzi	2:29.70	Finished
3	Chris DiGangi	3:00.61	Finished
4	Travis Rosen	3:01.97	Finished
5	Brad Spine	3:13.00	Finished
6	Kyle Stradtman	3:21.46	Finished
7	Rigel Henry	3:32.82	Finished
8	Phillip Hucke	3:47.64	Finished
9	Isaac Caldiero	3:59.91	Finished
10	Flex Labreck	4:04.33	Finished
11	Ethan Swanson	0:37.77	Spin Hopper
12	Trevor West	0:49.60	Spin Hopper
13	Brian Arnold	1:02.21	Spin Hopper
14	Tyler Yamauchi	1:05.53	Spin Hopper
15	Nate Tackett	1:16.15	Spin Hopper
16	Eric Sheppard	1:28.40	Spin Hopper
17	James Wilson	1:28.76	Spin Hopper
18	Alex Carson	1:38.22	Spin Hopper
19	Jonas Duncan	1:38.40	Spin Hopper
20	Kyle Schulze	1:39.18	Spin Hopper
21	Kourtney Timmons	1:40.73	Spin Hopper
22	David Womelsdorf	1:44.24	Spin Hopper
23	Mario Brown	2:00.28	Spin Hopper
24	Mike Wright	2:01.60	Spin Hopper
25	Jesse Maurer	2:20.26	Spin Hopper
26	Alex Bienz	2:21.64	Spin Hopper
27	Mohammed Almarzouq	2:21.84	Spin Hopper
28	Nicole Martinez	2:22.77	Spin Hopper
29	Jeri D'Aurelio	2:27.66	Spin Hopper
30	Marcelino Riley	2:35.86	Spin Hopper

Top 5 Women
Rank	Competitor	Time	Furthest Obstacle
1	Jesse Labreck	4:04.33	Finished
2	Nicole Martinez	2:22.77	Spin Hopper
3	Jeri D'Aurelio	2:27.66	Spin Hopper
4	Madelynn McNeal	2:50.39	Spin Hopper
5	Meghan Anten	0:38.05	Wheel Flip

==== Finals ====
The Indianapolis Finals replaced the Floating Steps with the Archer Steps. Cannonball Drop was replaced with the Fly Wheels, and a new obstacle, Cane Lane, was added to the back half. Italics denote the Top 2 women who also finished in the overall Top 15.

Top 15 Competitors
Rank	Competitor	Time	Furthest Obstacle
1	Ethan Swanson	5:44.36	Finished
2	Trevor West	5:48.76	Finished
3	Rigel Henry	6:36.43	Finished
4	Dan Polizzi	4:52.13	Spider Trap
5	Tyler Yamauchi	3:29.39	Cane Lane
6	Michael Bougher	3:46.21	Cane Lane
7	Travis Rosen	3:46.57	Cane Lane
8	Chris DiGangi	4:01.67	Cane Lane
9	Brad Spine	4:12.76	Cane Lane
10	Kyle Schulze	4:36.11	Cane Lane
11	Mike Wright	4:42.44	Cane Lane
12	Flex Labreck	5:09.83	Cane Lane
13	Brian Arnold	5:25.10	Cane Lane
14	Alex Carson	3:52.71	The Clacker
15	Philip Hucke	3:06.80	Salmon Ladder

Top 2 Women
Rank	Competitor	Time	Furthest Obstacle
1	Jesse Labreck	5:09.83	Cane Lane
2	Jeri D'Aurelio	1:35.91	Spin Hopper

=== Philadelphia ===
==== Qualifying ====
The Philadelphia Qualifying featured two new obstacles, the Spinning Bowties and Lightning Bolts. In attendance was the Philadelphia Eagles cheerleaders and their mascot "Swoop", as well as former Eagles wide receiver-turned ANW fan, Jason Avant, who ran the course. His former teammate Quintin Mikell and current Eagles cornerback Jalen Mills showed their support on the sidelines. This was the first qualifier that 3 women finished the course on the same night – Michelle Warnky, Allyssa Beird and rookie Casey Rothschild, who, at 20 years old, was the youngest female competitor (and the second female rookie ever) to hit the buzzer after Meagan Martin.

Bold denotes the finishers who completed the Mega Wall and received a $10,000 bonus.
Italics denote the Top 5 women who also finished in the overall Top 30.

Top 30 Competitors
Rank	Competitor	Time	Furthest Obstacle
1	**Chris Wilczewski**	2:01.53	Finished (Mega Wall)
2	Dave Cavanagh	2:13.21	Finished
3	Matt Strollo	2:34.06	Finished
4	Jamie Rahn	2:37.50	Finished
5	James McGrath	2:38.54	Finished
6	**Najee Richardson**	2:53.86	Finished (Mega Wall)
7	Chad Riddle	3:06.52	Finished
8	Mike Bernardo	3:06.71	Finished
9	Judas Licciardello	3:12.50	Finished
10	Michelle Warnky	3:57.05	Finished
11	Allyssa Beird	4:02.86	Finished
12	Casey Rothschild	4:57.25	Finished
13	Lucas Reale	0:51.65	Lightning Bolts
14	Zach Day	1:05.44	Lightning Bolts
15	Tyler Waters	1:07.09	Lightning Bolts
16	Chris Fantauzzo	1:07.10	Lightning Bolts
17	Christian DeRubeis	1:07.59	Lightning Bolts
18	Angel Rodriguez	1:09.09	Lightning Bolts
19	Cody Coppola	1:11.05	Lightning Bolts
20	Alex Nye	1:14.39	Lightning Bolts
21	Andrew Sherk	1:14.82	Lightning Bolts
22	James Bartholomew	1:17.57	Lightning Bolts
23	Logan Kreglow	1:20.17	Lightning Bolts
24	Darion Bennet	1:26.16	Lightning Bolts
25	Shawn Johnson	1:31.07	Lightning Bolts
26	Gavin Ross	1:33.99	Lightning Bolts
27	Paul Ruggeri III	1:36.74	Lightning Bolts
28	Brian Pease	1:39.65	Lightning Bolts
29	Ryan Lee	1:42.46	Lightning Bolts
30	John Uga	1:46.59	Lightning Bolts

Top 5 Women
Rank	Competitor	Time	Furthest Obstacle
1	Michelle Warnky	3:57.05	Finished
2	Allyssa Beird	4:02.86	Finished
3	Casey Rothschild	4:57.25	Finished
4	Cara Mack	2:19.45	Lightning Bolts
5	McKinley Pierce	0:55.89	Wingnuts

==== Finals ====
In attendance again were the Philadelphia Eagles cheerleaders and mascot Swoop, along with the cheerleaders from Villanova University were cheering on the athletes. The Philadelphia Finals featured one new obstacle, Captain's Wheel.

Italics denote the Top 2 women who also finished in the overall Top 15.

Top 15 Competitors
Rank	Competitor	Time	Furthest Obstacle
1	Chris Wilczewski	4:59.86	Finished
2	Najee Richardson	5:54.95	Finished
3	Jamie Rahn	6:19.63	Finished
4	James McGrath	3:37.80	Spider Trap
5	Dave Cavanagh	3:26.93	Spinball Wizard
6	Judas Licciardello	3:37.57	Spinball Wizard
7	Angel Rodriguez	2:48.88	Captain's Wheel
8	Lucas Reale	2:58.61	Captain's Wheel
9	Zach Day	3:17.59	Captain's Wheel
10	Gavin Ross	3:19.09	Captain's Wheel
11	Allyssa Beird	4:02.12	Captain's Wheel
12	Michelle Warnky	4:54.18	Captain's Wheel
13	Matt Strollo	1:57.16	Salmon Ladder
14	James Bartholomew	0:50.76	Lightning Bolts
15	Logan Kreglow	1:00.63	Lightning Bolts

Top 2 Women
Rank	Competitor	Time	Furthest Obstacle
1	Allyssa Beird	4:02.12	Captain's Wheel
2	Michelle Warnky	4:54.18	Captain's Wheel

=== Minneapolis ===
==== Qualifying ====
The Minneapolis Qualifying featured two new obstacles, the Double Twister and Diamond Dash. The competition was held outside U.S. Bank Stadium where the Minnesota Vikings play. The Minnesota Vikings Cheerleaders and the team's mascot Viktor the Viking and drumline the "Skol Line", along with the University of Minnesota cheerleaders and the school's mascot, Goldy Gopher, and also the Mayor of Minneapolis, Jacob Frey came to support the ninjas. No competitors were able to complete the Mega Wall.

Italics denote the Top 5 women who also finished in the overall Top 30.

Top 30 Competitors
Rank	Competitor	Time	Furthest Obstacle
1	Joe Moravsky	2:38.38	Finished
2	Eric Middleton	2:50.18	Finished
3	Leif Sundberg	2:51.81	Finished
4	Michael Torres	2:52.00	Finished
5	Jake Murray	2:55.71	Finished
6	Mike Meyers	2:55.77	Finished
7	Jonathan Stevens	3:03.65	Finished
8	Lance Pekus	3:06.55	Finished
9	Tyler Gillett	3:58.40	Finished
10	Dan Delano	4:05.59	Finished
11	Sean Darling-Hammond	4:11.45	Finished
12	Ian Dory	4:34.54	Finished
13	Dalton Knapp	4:48.99	Finished
14	Abby Clark	5:27.48	Finished
15	Austin Gray	2:39.74	Warped Wall
16	Drew Knapp	1:09.93	Battering Ram
17	Hunter Guerard	1:25.25	Battering Ram
18	Michael Silenzi	1:31.73	Battering Ram
19	Karson Voiles	1:36.00	Battering Ram
20	Justin Cranmer	2:19.62	Battering Ram
21	Jelani Allen	2:20.32	Battering Ram
22	Meagan Martin	3:04.74	Battering Ram
23	Jaysen Saly	3:10.54	Battering Ram
24	Garrett Lam	3:18.27	Battering Ram
25	Jon Alexis Jr.	0:51.10	Diamond Dash
26	Ben Antoine	1:15.78	Diamond Dash
27	Andrew "Roo" Yori	1:19.19	Diamond Dash
28	James Gomez	1:26.84	Diamond Dash
29	Danny Bergstrom	1:32.84	Diamond Dash
30	Julius Ferguson	1:45.07	Diamond Dash

Top 5 Women
Rank	Competitor	Time	Furthest Obstacle
1	Abby Clark	5:27.48	Finished
2	Meagan Martin	3:04.74	Battering Ram
3	Sarah Schoback	0:45.42	Ring Jump
4	Jamie Ross	0:50.70	Ring Jump
5	Sara Heesen	0:56.05	Ring Jump

==== Finals ====
The Minneapolis Finals replaced the Floating Steps with the Archer Steps and replaced the Ring Jump with the Sky Hooks. One new obstacle was added to the back half, the Hinge.

Top 15 Competitors
Rank	Competitor	Time	Furthest Obstacle
1	Jon Alexis Jr.	4:48.50	Finished
2	Joe Moravsky	5:02.30	Finished
3	Jake Murray	5:21.57	Finished
4	Jonathan Stevens	6:25.31	Finished
5	Ian Dory	7:57.57	Finished
6	Mike Meyers	2:50.50	Iron Maiden
7	Eric Middleton	2:57.24	Iron Maiden
8	Karson Voiles	3:10.31	Iron Maiden
9	Hunter Guerard	3:13.59	Iron Maiden
10	Lance Pekus	3:13.81	Iron Maiden
11	Drew Knapp	3:36.79	Iron Maiden
12	Austin Gray	3:45.63	Iron Maiden
13	Danny Bergestrom	3:51.72	Iron Maiden
14	Tyler Gillett	4:11.30	Iron Maiden
15	Sean Darling-Hammond	4:17.85	Iron Maiden

Top 2 Women
Rank	Competitor	Time	Furthest Obstacle
1	Meagan Martin	4:33.16	Iron Maiden
2	Abby Clark	3:31.13	Warped Wall

== City Qualifying Leaderboard ==
Bold denotes the finishers who completed the Mega Wall and received a $10,000 bonus.
Italics denote the Top 5 women who also finished in the overall Top 30.

Top 180 Competitors
Rank	Competitor	Time	Furthest Obstacle
1	**Daniel Gil**	1:40.79	Finished
2	**Chris Wilczewski**	2:01.53	Finished
3	Matthew Day	2:09.62	Finished
4	Dave Cavanagh	2:13.21	Finished
5	Josh Salinas	2:21.30	Finished
6	Drew Drechsel	2:24.74	Finished
7	Brian Rambo	2:26.54	Finished
8	Michael Bougher	2:29.54	Finished
9	Dan Polizzi	2:29.70	Finished
10	Matt Strollo	2:34.06	Finished
11	Mathis "Kid" Owhadi	2:36.58	Finished
12	Jamie Rahn	2:37.50	Finished
13	Joe Moravsky	2:38.38	Finished
14	James McGrath	2:38.54	Finished
15	Thomas Stillings	2:38.88	Finished
16	Jeremiah Morgan	2:41.27	Finished
17	Eric Middleton	2:50.18	Finished
18	Leif Sundberg	2:51.81	Finished
19	Michael Torres	2:52.00	Finished
20	**Najee Richardson**	2:53.86	Finished
21	Jake Murray	2:55.71	Finished
22	Mike Meyers	2:55.77	Finished
23	Chris DiGangi	3:00.61	Finished
24	Travis Rosen	3:01.97	Finished
25	Jonathan Stevens	3:03.65	Finished
26	Chad Riddle	3:06.52	Finished
27	Lance Pekus	3:06.55	Finished
28	Mike Bernardo	3:06.71	Finished
29	Nicholas Coolridge	3:07.73	Finished
30	Thomas Kofron	3:10.56	Finished
31	Josh Levin	3:11.40	Finished
32	**Adam Rayl**	3:12.46	Finished
33	Judas Licciardello	3:12.50	Finished
34	Brad Spine	3:13.00	Finished
35	Kyle Stradtman	3:14.46	Finished
36	Andrew Swinghamer	3:27.14	Finished
37	Rigel Henry	3:32.82	Finished
38	Kenny Niemitalo	3:36.33	Finished
39	Spencer Clapp	3:47.86	Finished
40	Abel Gonzalez	3:52.26	Finished
41	Calle Alexander	3:56.18	Finished
42	Sean Bryan	3:56.84	Finished
43	Michelle Warnky	3:57.05	Finished
44	Phillip Hucke	3:57.64	Finished
45	Tyler Gillett	3:58.40	Finished
46	Isaac Caldiero	3:59.91	Finished
47	Allyssa Beird	4:02.86	Finished
48	Jesse Labreck	4:04.33	Finished
49	Dan Delano	4:05.59	Finished
50	Brett Sims	4:07.95	Finished
51	Neil Craver	4:10.87	Finished
52	Sean Darling-Hammond	4:11.45	Finished
53	Tyler Humphrey	4:12.67	Finished
54	**Ryan Stratis**	4:20.44	Finished
55	Eddy Stewart	4:25.41	Finished
56	Kevin Jordan	4:29.18	Finished
57	Nick Patel	4:33.39	Finished
58	Ian Dory	4:34.54	Finished
59	Tremayne Dortch	4:38.73	Finished
60	Mike Murray	4:45.67	Finished
61	Dalton Knapp	4:48.99	Finished
62	David Campbell	4:49.98	Finished
63	Bootie Cothran	4:53.73	Finished
64	Casey Rothschild	4:57.25	Finished
65	Jessie Graff	4:57.43	Finished
66	Morgan "Moose" Wright	5:04.81	Finished
67	**Nick Hanson**	5:07.97	Finished
68	Abby Clark	5:27.48	Finished
69	Jon Stewart	5:43.61	Finished
70	Brian Kretsch	6:07.67	Finished
71	Austin Gray	2:39.74	Warped Wall
72	Venn Johns	3:48.00	Warped Wall
73	Ethan Swanson	0:37.77	Spin Hopper
74	Kevin Bull	0:45.65	Doorknob Drop
75	Trevor West	0:49.60	Spin Hopper
76	Lucas Reale	0:51.65	Lightning Bolts
77	Brian Arnold	1:02.21	Spin Hopper
78	Zach Day	1:05.44	Lightning Bolts
79	Tyler Yamauchi	1:05.53	Spin Hopper
80	Jesse Orenshein	1:05.63	Doorknob Drop
81	Tyler Waters	1:07.09	Lightning Bolts
82	Chris Fantauzzo	1:07.10	Lightning Bolts
83	Christian DeRubeis	1:07.59	Lightning Bolts
84	Flip Rodriguez	1:08.92	Doorknob Drop
85	Angel Rodriguez	1:09.09	Lightning Bolts
86	Drew Knapp	1:09.93	Battering Ram
87	Cody Coppola	1:11.05	Lightning Bolts
88	Alex Nye	1:14.39	Lightning Bolts
89	Scott Willson	1:14.77	Doorknob Drop
90	Andrew Sherk	1:14.82	Lightning Bolts
91	Nate Tackett	1:16.15	Spin Hopper
92	Jeremy Rivette	1:16.57	Doorknob Drop
93	Davyon Hancox	1:16.88	Doorknob Drop
94	James Bartholomew	1:17.57	Lightning Bolts
95	Logan Kreglow	1:20.17	Lightning Bolts
96	Andrew Lowes	1:20.86	Crank It Up
97	Derek Miyamoto	1:22.44	Doorknob Drop
98	Hunter Guerard	1:25.25	Battering Ram
99	Darion Bennett	1:26.16	Lightning Bolts
100	Nate Burkhalter	1:27.47	Crank It Up
101	Anthony Trucks	1:28.34	Doorknob Drop
102	Eric Sheppard	1:28.40	Spin Hopper
103	James Wilson	1:28.76	Spin Hopper
104	Tiana Webberley	1:30.81	Doorknob Drop
105	Shawn Johnson	1:31.07	Lightning Bolts
106	Michael Silenzi	1:31.73	Battering Ram
107	Gavin Ross	1:33.99	Lightning Bolts
108	Tylor Schlorf	1:35.61	Doorknob Drop
109	Joe Mardovich	1:35.94	Doorknob Drop
110	Karson Voiles	1:36.00	Battering Ram
111	Brock Taylor	1:36.57	Doorknob Drop
112	Paul Rugerri III	1:36.74	Lightning Bolts
113	Kevin Carbone	1:37.90	Slippery Summit
114	Alex Carson	1:38.22	Spin Hopper
115	Jonas Duncan	1:38.40	Spin Hopper
116	Grant McCartney	1:38.89	Doorknob Drop
117	Austin Seibert	1:39.00	Doorknob Drop
118	Kyle Schulze	1:39.18	Spin Hopper
119	Brian Pease	1:39.65	Lightning Bolts
120	Kourtney Timmons	1:40.73	Spin Hopper
121	Ruben Arellano	1:40.92	Doorknob Drop
122	Gabe Hurtado	1:41.88	Doorknob Drop
123	Ryan Lee	1:42.46	Lightning Bolts
124	Verdale Benson	1:43.27	Doorknob Drop
125	Eric Nelson	1:43.28	Doorknob Drop
126	David Womelsdorf	1:44.24	Spin Hopper
127	Steven Tucker	1:46.56	Crank It Up
128	John Uga	1:46.59	Lightning Bolts
129	Westley Silvestri	1:47.28	Doorknob Drop
130	Chris Cambre	1:48.26	Crank It Up
131	Josh Norton	1:48.98	Crank It Up
132	Todd Bourgeois	1:51.22	Slippery Summit
133	R.J. Roman	1:51.38	Slippery Summit
134	Brian Neal	1:52.82	Doorknob Drop
135	Eli Bell	1:53.42	Slippery Summit
136	Drew Hendry	1:59.93	Slippery Summit
137	Mario Brown	2:00.28	Spin Hopper
138	Mike Wright	2:01.60	Spin Hopper
139	Doug Legg	2:06.31	Slippery Summit
140	Adam Ster	2:07.13	Crank It Up
141	Casey Suchocki	2:08.76	Slippery Summit
142	Jason Bergstrom	2:19.57	Slippery Summit
143	Justin Cranmer	2:19.62	Battering Ram
144	Jesse Maurer	2:20.26	Spin Hopper
145	Jelani Allen	2:20.32	Battering Ram
146	Alex Bienz	2:21.64	Spin Hopper
147	Mohammed Almarzouq	2:21.84	Spin Hopper
148	Nicole Martinez	2:22.77	Spin Hopper
149	Jeri D'Aurelio	2:27.66	Spin Hopper
150	Dylan Lancaster	2:30.18	Crank It Up
151	Greg Manders	2:32.16	Slippery Summit
152	Victor Gonzalez	2:33.18	Crank It Up
153	Ethan Surprenant	2:33.21	Slippery Summit
154	Jordan Brown	2:33.28	Slippery Summit
155	Marcelino Riley	2:35.86	Spin Hopper
156	Nico Long	2:41.80	Slippery Summit
157	Rachael Goldstein	2:47.80	Slippery Summit
158	Oscar Ramirez	2:48.02	Slippery Summit
159	Louis Moore	2:52.04	Crank It Up
160	Lindsay Eskildsen	2:54.12	Slippery Summit
161	Reko Rivera	3:01.65	Slippery Summit
162	Devin Harrelson	3:02.57	Slippery Summit
163	Meagan Martin	3:04.74	Battering Ram
164	Erik Brown	3:06.43	Crank It Up
165	Scott Reuter	3:07.91	Slippery Summit
166	Jaysen Sally	3:10.54	Battering Ram
167	Michael Johnson	3:15.36	Slippery Summit
168	Garrett Lam	3:18.27	Battering Ram
169	Karen Wiltin	3:48.91	Crank It Up
170	Quest O'Neal	3:57.48	Crank It Up
171	Karsten Williams	0:42.40	Tuning Forks
172	Brent Steffensen	0:49.52	Tuning Forks
173	Jon Alexis Jr.	0:51.10	Diamond Dash
174	Brian Burkhardt	0:52.20	Tuning Forks
175	Elliott Jolivette	0:56.60	Tuning Forks
176	Ben Antoine	1:15.78	Diamond Dash
177	Andrew "Roo" Yori	1:19.19	Diamond Dash
178	James Gomez	1:26.84	Diamond Dash
179	Danny Bergstrom	1:32.84	Diamond Dash
180	Julius Ferguson	1:45.07	Diamond Dash

Top 30 Women
Rank	Competitor	Time	Furthest Obstacle
1	Michelle Warnky	3:57.05	Finished
2	Allyssa Beird	4:02.86	Finished
3	Jesse Labreck	4:04.33	Finished
4	Casey Rothschild	4:57.25	Finished
5	Jessie Graff	4:57.43	Finished
6	Abby Clark	5:27.48	Finished
7	Tiana Webberley	1:30.81	Doorknob Drop
8	Zhanique Lovett	2:04.76	Doorknob Drop
9	Cara Poalillo	2:19.45	Lightning Bolts
10	Nicole Martinez	2:22.77	Spin Hopper
11	Jeri D'Aurelio	2:27.66	Spin Hopper
12	Selena Laniel	2:38.74	Doorknob Drop
13	Rachael Goldstein	2:47.80	Slippery Summit
14	Madelynn McNeal	2:50.39	Spin Hopper
15	Lindsay Eskildsen	2:54.12	Slippery Summit
16	Meagan Martin	3:04.74	Battering Ram
17	Anna Shumaker	3:08.26	Doorknob Drop
18	Jessica Clayton	3:19.74	Slippery Summit
19	Karen Wiltin	3:48.91	Crank It Up
20	Quest O'Neal	3:57.48	Crank It Up
21	McKinley Pierce	0:55.89	Wingnuts
22	Emily Durham	1:14.60	Ring Turn
23	Samantha Bush	1:27.62	Sky Hooks
24	Barclay Stockett	1:30.32	Tuning Forks
25	Brittany Hanks	2:05.65	Tuning Forks
26	Meghan Anten	0:38.05	Wheel Flip
27	Sarah Schoback	0:45.42	Ring Jump
28	Kat Ratcliff	0:48.73	Bouncing Spider
29	Jamie Ross	0:50.70	Ring Jump
30	Sara Heesen	0:56.05	Ring Jump

== City Finals Leaderboard ==
Italics denote the Top 2 women who also finished in the overall Top 15.

Top 90 Competitors
Rank	Competitor	Time	Furthest Obstacle
1	Daniel Gil	3:54.73	Finished
2	Matthew Day	4:37.10	Finished
3	Josh Salinas	4:38.49	Finished
4	Jon Alexis Jr.	4:48.50	Finished
5	Chris Wilczewski	4:59.86	Finished
6	Joe Moravsky	5:02.30	Finished
7	Jeremiah Morgan	5:16.53	Finished
8	Jake Murray	5:21.57	Finished
9	Mathis "Kid" Owhadi	5:37.17	Finished
10	Ethan Swanson	5:44.36	Finished
11	Trevor West	5:48.76	Finished
12	Najee Richardson	5:54.95	Finished
13	Sean Bryan	6:09.99	Finished
14	Nicholas Coolridge	6:10.92	Finished
15	Jamie Rahn	6:19.63	Finished
16	Josh Levin	6:21.84	Finished
17	Jonathan Stevens	6:25.31	Finished
18	Kevin Bull	6:31.31	Finished
19	Brian Rambo	6:33.63	Finished
20	Rigel Henry	6:36.43	Finished
21	Adam Rayl	6:37.39	Finished
22	Flip Rodriguez	6:38.17	Finished
23	David Campbell	7:01.27	Finished
24	Kenny Niemitalo	7:41.90	Finished
25	Brett Sims	7:42.76	Finished
26	Ian Dory	7:57.57	Finished
27	Derek Miyamoto	8:10.39	Finished
28	Ryan Stratis	8:25.63	Finished
29	James McGrath	3:37.80	Spider Trap
30	Dan Polizzi	4:53.13	Spider Trap
31	Spencer Clapp	6:27.21	Spider Trap
32	Mike Meyers	2:50.50	Iron Maiden
33	Eric Middleton	2:57.24	Iron Maiden
34	Thomas Stillings	3:06.96	Fallout
35	Karson Voiles	3:10.31	Iron Maiden
36	Hunter Guerard	3:13.59	Iron Maiden
37	Lance Pekus	3:13.81	Iron Maiden
38	Dave Cavanagh	3:26.93	Spinball Wizard
39	Tyler Yamauchi	3:29.39	Cane Lane
40	Abel Gonzalez	3:31.85	Fallout
41	Drew Knapp	3:36.79	Iron Maiden
42	Judas Licciardello	3:37.57	Spinball Wizard
43	Austin Gray	3:45.63	Iron Maiden
44	Michael Bougher	3:46.21	Cane Lane
45	Travis Rosen	3:46.57	Cane Lane
46	Danny Bergstrom	3:51.72	Iron Maiden
47	Drew Drechsel	3:56.75	Stair Hopper
48	Chris DiGangi	4:01.67	Cane Lane
49	Tyler Gillett	4:11.30	Iron Maiden
50	Brad Spine	4:12.76	Cane Lane
51	Sean Darling-Hammond	4:17.85	Iron Maiden
52	Kyle Schulze	4:36.11	Cane Lane
53	Mike Wright	4:42.44	Cane Lane
54	Thomas Kofron	4:58.34	Baton Pass
55	Jesse Labreck	5:09.83	Cane Lane
56	Brian Arnold	5:25.10	Cane Lane
57	Nick Hanson	5:28.83	Baton Pass
58	Jessie Graff	5:32.60	Stair Hopper
59	Eric Nelson	5:43.21	Baton Pass
60	Davyon Hancox	5:56.56	Baton Pass
61	Brian Kretsch	6:01.69	Baton Pass
62	Brian Burkhardt	1:40.86	Nail Clipper
63	Elliott Jolivette	2:24.68	Nail Clipper
64	Karsten Williams	2:27.76	Nail Clipper
65	Andrew Swinghamer	2:33.66	Nail Clipper
66	Mike Murray	2:48.77	Nail Clipper
67	Angel Rodriguez	2:48.88	Captain's Wheel
68	Brent Steffensen	2:50.72	Nail Clipper
69	Lucas Reale	2:58.61	Captain's Wheel
70	Zach Day	3:17.59	Captain's Wheel
71	Gavin Ross	3:19.09	Captain's Wheel
72	Michael Johnson	3:26.25	Crazy Clocks
73	Casey Suchocki	3:32.99	Crazy Clocks
74	Alex Carson	3:52.71	The Clacker
75	Allyssa Beird	4:02.12	Captain's Wheel
76	Josh Norton	4:03.23	Nail Clipper
77	Todd Bourgeois	4:05.71	Crazy Clocks
78	Kevin Jordan	4:10.84	Nail Clipper
79	Nick Patel	4:21.10	Crazy Clocks
80	Michelle Warnky	4:54.18	Captain's Wheel
81	Neil Craver	4:55.57	Crazy Clocks
82	R.J. Roman	5:02.32	Crazy Clocks
83	Drew Hendry	5:19.58	Crazy Clocks
84	Bootie Cothran	5:35.24	Crazy Clocks
85	Rachael Goldstein	5:37.50	Crazy Clocks
86	Matt Strollo	1:57.16	Salmon Ladder
87	Reko Rivera	2:27.14	Salmon Ladder
88	Phillip Hucke	3:06.80	Salmon Ladder
89	James Bartholomew	0:50.76	Lightning Bolts
90	Logan Kreglow	1:00.63	Lightning Bolts

Top 12 Women
Rank	Competitor	Time	Furthest Obstacle
1	Meagan Martin	4:33.16	Iron Maiden
2	Jesse Labreck	5:09.83	Cane Lane
3	Jessie Graff	5:32.60	Stair Hopper
4	Tiana Webberley	7:21.16	Baton Pass
5	Allyssa Beird	4:02.12	Captain's Wheel
6	Barclay Stockett	4:25.20	Nail Clipper
7	Michelle Warnky	4:54.18	Captain's Wheel
8	Rachael Goldstein	5:37.50	Crazy Clocks
9	Anna Shumaker	7:11.08	Giant Cubes
10	Abby Clark	3:31.13	Warped Wall
11	Jeri D'Aurelio	1:35.91	Spin Hopper
12	Brittany Hanks	1:55.96	Broken Bridge

== National Finals ==
The National Finals were taped in June 2018 on the vacant lot across from the Luxor Hotel on the Las Vegas Strip that has been home to the Finals since the show stopped sending the finalists to Japan. The lot is close to the Las Vegas Village location of the Route 91 Harvest Festival shootings, which led the producers to consider finding another venue before deciding to return. The taping took place on the first two nights of a weeklong session that also included tapings for the "USA vs. The World", "All-Stars Team Challenge", and "All-Stars Skills Challenge" special events.

This season, 97 competitors made it to Vegas. In attendance were the Vegas Golden Knights cheerleaders and mascot Chance cheering on the competitors.

Note: Even though she earned a place in the Las Vegas finals, 5-time ANW finalist Jessie Graff cannot compete because of her shooting schedule while filming Wonder Woman 1984 (Wonder Woman sequel) as a stuntwoman. Jessie is seen on the Stage 1 finals Day 2 episode in Canary Islands, Spain telling the viewers about it and wishing her fellow competitors "good luck".

=== Stage 1 ===
30 Competitors made it through this grueling Stage 1 course. The Double Dipper knocked out 26 competitors on Stage 1, the most of any obstacle on Stage 1, including David Campbell, Brett Sims, Travis Rosen, Flip Rodriguez, Jeremiah Morgan, Chris DiGangi, Karsten Williams, Neil Craver, Abel Gonzalez, Tyler Yamuachi, Rigel Henry, Michael Johnson, Rachael Goldstein, Abby Clark, and the man who made it the farthest the previous season, Joe Moravsky. In Travis Rosen's case, he broke his ankle at the dismount, which eventually resulted in him urgently being rushed to the hospital, as it was confirmed by the paramedics that his right ankle had been fractured from the impact.

The highlight of Stage 1 was Jamie Rahn who became the first competitor in ANW to finish the course barefoot when he ran the course (for the most part) without shoes when his right sneaker came off during the Propeller Bar. He completed the course in 2:17.93.

Stage 1 featured four new obstacles, Archer Alley, Jeep Run, the Razor Beams, and Twist & Fly.

Table key
Key	Description
	Run aired on Night 1
	Run aired on Night 2
	Run unaired

Stage 1 Finishers
Rank	Competitor	Time
1	Jake Murray	1:36.00
2	Drew Drechsel	1:36.20
3	Mathis "Kid" Owhadi	1:44.71
4	Daniel Gil	1:46.65
5	Austin Gray	1:51.11
6	Drew Knapp	2:00.32
7	Adam Rayl	2:01.04
8	Josh Salinas	2:02.25
9	Tyler Gillett	2:02.27
10	Najee Richardson	2:02.86
11	R.J. Roman	2:03.10
12	Ethan Swanson	2:03.79
13	Karson Voiles	2:05.22
14	Sean Bryan	2:06.05
15	Josh Levin	2:08.10
16	Hunter Guerard	2:08.68
17	Eric Middleton	2:08.84
18	Lucas Reale	2:09.20
19	Mike Meyers	2:10.15
20	Thomas Stillings	2:10.42
21	Brian Burkhardt	2:13.11
22	Angel Rodriguez	2:14.12
23	Jonathan Stevens	2:14.42
24	Chris Wilczewski	2:15.29
25	Dan Polizzi	2:15.93
26	Nicholas Coolridge	2:16.84
27	Jamie Rahn	2:17.93
28	Mike Murray	2:19.60
29	Zach Day	2:20.09
30	Casey Suchocki	2:20.51

=== Stage 2 ===
Stage 2 featured three new obstacles, Epic Catch and Release, Deja Vu, and the first underwater obstacle, the Water Walls.

Results:
Competitor	Result	Notes
Josh Salinas	5.Wingnut Alley	Lost grip on third wingnut.
Nicholas Coolridge	2.Criss Cross Salmon Ladder	Digest. Derailed bar before second horizontal transition.
Tyler Gillett	3.Deja Vu	Digest. Fell before hooking first bar into second cradle.
Casey Suchocki	3.Deja Vu	Digest. Lost grip after unhooking second bar.
Daniel Gil	3.Deja Vu	Fell after unhooking one side of the second bar.
Chris Wilczewski	5.Wingnut Alley	Digest. Transition to second wingnut.
Jake Murray	1.Epic Catch and Release	Lost grip after un-hooking second handle.
R.J. Roman	5.Wingnut Alley	Transition to third wingnut.
Lucas Reale	2.Criss Cross Salmon Ladder	Digest. Third level.
Dan Polizzi	3.Deja Vu	Digest. Lost grip after un-hooking second bar.
Josh Levin	5.Wingnut Alley	Digest. Transition to fourth wingnut.
Najee Richardson	6.Water Walls	Time out after clearing final wall.
Angel Rodriguez	2.Criss Cross Salmon Ladder	Digest. Third level.
Mike Murray	3.Deja Vu	Digest. Lost grip while transitioning to second bar.
Karson Voiles	5.Wingnut Alley	Digest. Transition to second wingnut.
Mathis "Kid" Owhadi	5.Wingnut Alley	Transition to third wingnut.
Thomas Stillings	3.Deja Vu	Digest. Fell after unhooking one side of the second bar.
Mike Meyers	3.Deja Vu	Digest. Fell after unhooking one side of the second bar.
Hunter Guerard	3.Deja Vu	Digest. Fell after unhooking one side of the second bar.
Sean Bryan	FINISH (21.70 seconds left)	
Zach Day	5.Wingnut Alley	Shown in commercial run. Lost grip on third wingnut.
Adam Rayl	2.Criss Cross Salmon Ladder	Derailed bar before second horizontal transition.
Austin Gray	3.Deja Vu	Lost grip after unhooking first bar.
Eric Middleton	3.Deja Vu	Digest. Lost grip on second bar.
Drew Knapp	5.Wingnut Alley	Digest. Lost grip on third wingnut.
Ethan Swanson	5.Wingnut Alley	Digest. Transition to second wingnut.
Jamie Rahn	5.Wingnut Alley	Transition to second wingnut.
Jonathan Stevens	2.Criss Cross Salmon Ladder	Digest. Sixth level.
Brian Burkhardt	5.Wingnut Alley	Digest. Transition to second wingnut.
Drew Drechsel	FINISH (38.65 seconds left).	

==== Leaderboard ====
Order	Competitor	Outcome	Result
1	Drew Drechsel	Finished	3:51.35
2	Sean Bryan	Finished	4:08.30

=== Stage 3 ===
Stage 3 featured one new obstacle, En Garde.

Run Order	Competitor	Result	Notes
1	Sean Bryan	4. Ultimate Cliffhanger	Transition to final ledge.
2	Drew Drechsel	4. Ultimate Cliffhanger	Transition to final ledge.

For the first time on American Ninja Warrior, a cash prize is guaranteed to the player who makes it furthest in the competition of $100,000, in the event that no one completes Stage 4. Drew Drechsel became season 10's Last Ninja Standing on the tie-breaker over Sean Bryan, as Sean failed at the Ultimate Cliffhanger.

== Ratings ==
Episode		Air date	Timeslot	Rating/Share (18–49)		Viewers (millions)	DVR 18–49	DVR Viewers (millions)	Total 18–49	Total Viewers
1	"Dallas City Qualifiers"	May 30, 2018	Wednesday 8:00 p.m.	1.2	5	5.35	0.2	0.57	1.4	5.95
2	"Los Angeles City Qualifiers"	June 6, 2018	Wednesday 8:00 p.m.	1.2	5	5.16	0.2	0.93	1.4	6.09
3	"Miami City Qualifiers"	June 13, 2018	Wednesday 8:00 p.m.	1.1	5	5.14	0.1	0.49	1.2	5.63
4	"Indianapolis City Qualifiers"	June 18, 2018	Monday 9:00 p.m.	1.0	4	4.29	0.3	0.86	1.3	5.15
5	"Philadelphia City Qualifiers"	June 25, 2018	Monday 9:00 p.m.	0.9	4	4.21	—N/a	—N/a	—N/a	—N/a
6	"Minneapolis City Qualifiers"	July 9, 2018	Monday 8:00 p.m.	1.0	4	5.00	0.2	0.79	1.2	5.79
7	"Los Angeles City Finals"	July 16, 2018	Monday 8:00 p.m.	1.1	5	5.19	0.2	0.79	1.3	5.98
8	"Dallas City Finals"	July 23, 2018	Monday 8:00 p.m.	1.0	5	5.08	0.3	0.83	1.3	5.91
9	"Miami City Finals"	July 30, 2018	Monday 8:00 p.m.	1.1	5	5.31	—N/a	—N/a	—N/a	—N/a
10	"Indianapolis City Finals"	August 6, 2018	Monday 8:00 p.m.	1.0	5	5.02	0.3	0.71	1.3	5.74
11	"Philadelphia City Finals"	August 13, 2018	Monday 8:00 p.m.	1.0	5	5.08	0.2	0.71	1.2	5.79
12	"Minneapolis City Finals"	August 20, 2018	Monday 8:00 p.m.	1.0	5	5.01	TBA	TBA	TBA	TBA
13	"National Finals Night 1"	August 27, 2018	Monday 8:00 p.m.	1.1	5	5.86	TBA	TBA	TBA	TBA
14	"National Finals Night 2"	September 3, 2018	Monday 8:00 p.m.	1.1	5	4.85	TBA	TBA	TBA	TBA
15	"National Finals Night 3"	September 10, 2018	Monday 8:00 p.m.	1.2	5	5.69	TBA	TBA	TBA	TBA
