= Freddie Falcon =

Mascot for the NFL's Atlanta Falcons

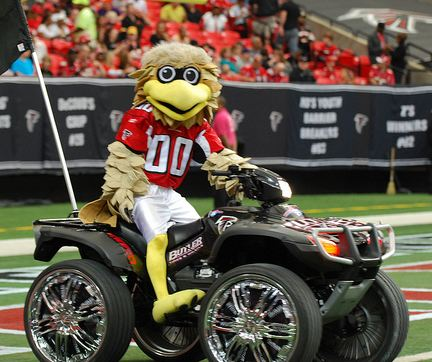
Freddie Falcon riding an ATV on the pitch in 2012

Frederick "Freddie" Falcon is the official mascot of the NFL's Atlanta Falcons, having represented the team since at least 1984.

== History ==
=== Background ===
During the 1966 season, the Falcons were represented by Thor, a live falcon who would perform pre-game and halftime flying manoeuvres for the crowd. After Thor went missing, trainer Mike Cady replaced him with two male falcons called Mercury (who also went missing) and Yak Yak. By November 1971, the team had stopped using live falcons as mascots.

In the 1973 season, the team were represented by a football-shaped mascot named "Rah Rah".

=== Freddie Falcon ===
By October 1984, the team was represented by Freddie Falcon.
