= American Ninja Warrior season 12 =

Season of American reality/sports competition television series American Ninja Warrior

American Ninja Warrior
- Season 12
- Hosted by: Matt Iseman; Akbar Gbaja-Biamila; Zuri Hall
- No. of contestants: 150
- Finals venue: St. Louis, Missouri
- No. of episodes: 8

Release
- Original network: NBC
- Original release: September 7 – November 6, 2020

Season chronology
- ← Previous; Season 11 Next → Season 13

The twelfth season of American Ninja Warrior premiered on September 7, 2020, and wrapped up on November 6, 2020, on NBC. Due to the COVID-19 pandemic in the United States, all eight episodes were filmed in St. Louis, Missouri from June 29 to July 25, 2020, behind closed doors in the America's Center convention center and stadium. Matt Iseman and Akbar Gbaja-Biamila returned for their respective eleventh and eighth seasons, while Zuri Hall returned for her second season on the show.

The course returns with the Mega Wall and Power Tower, and the fifty most popular athletes from previous seasons returned with two other ninjas (mostly rookies) of their choosing, like their ninja training partners or someone they have a special connection with. The top twelve competitors moved on to the semifinals after each qualifying episode, as well as the top three women. In this season, the player who won the Power Tower would get to bring their chosen rookies with them to the semifinals, even if the rookies had not made it into the top twelve finishers (or top three women). With the knockout tournament format, there were changes to the semifinal courses as well — unlike the past seasons, a competitor that completed the course would not automatically move on; they would have to be in the top 12 or have made it up the Mega Wall. One contestant, Nick Hanson, did not move on to the semifinals because of COVID contact tracing despite making it up the Mega Wall. Because of the format change to a knockout tournament and a team format instead of the traditional Sasuke format, the winner's prize has been decreased to only $100,000, which was awarded to the winner of the knockout tournament final.

== Obstacles ==
=== St. Louis Qualifying ===
| Event | Obstacles | | | | | | Finishers |
|---|---|---|---|---|---|---|---|
| Night 1 | Shrinking Steps | Weight for It | Ring Chaser | Rib Run | Slingshot | Warped Wall/Mega Wall | 8 |
| Night 2 | Shrinking Steps | Lunatic Ledges | Ring Chaser | Rib Run | Ferris Wheel | Warped Wall/Mega Wall | 14 |
| Night 3 | Shrinking Steps | Lunatic Ledges | Beehive | Spinning Bridge | Ferris Wheel | Warped Wall/Mega Wall | 9 |
| Night 4 | Shrinking Steps | Off the Hook | Beehive | Spinning Bridge | Sideways | Warped Wall/Mega Wall | 15 |

=== St. Louis Semifinals ===
| Event | Obstacles | | | | | | | | | | Finishers |
|---|---|---|---|---|---|---|---|---|---|---|---|
| Night 1 | Shrinking Steps | Off the Hook | Clockwork | Burn Rubber | Sideways | Warped Wall | Salmon Ladder | Corkscrew | The Dungeon | Spider Trap | 5 |
| Night 2 | Shrinking Steps | Spring Forward | Clockwork | Burn Rubber | Slingshot | Warped Wall | Salmon Ladder | Corkscrew | The Dungeon | Spider Trap | 6 |

=== St. Louis Finals ===
| Event | Obstacles | | | | | | | | | | Finishers |
|---|---|---|---|---|---|---|---|---|---|---|---|
| Finals | Shrinking Steps | Spring Forward | Falling Shelves | Diamond Dash | Spin Hopper | Warped Wall | Salmon Ladder | Slam Dunk | Dragonback | Spider Trap | 7 |

== St. Louis Qualifying ==
Key
Italics means that this competitor was also in the top 3 women.
Underline means that this competitor won the Power Tower.
**Bold** means that this competitor made it up the Mega Wall.

=== Night 1 ===
The first qualifying round featured three new obstacles, Weight for It, Ring Chaser, and Rib Run. Notable ninjas running the course were school teachers, medical professionals, and ICU nurses who were all making a difference on the frontlines of the COVID-19 pandemic. Also, former NFL linebacker Kamerion Wimbley returned after his record-setting season in 2012, being the biggest man (240 pounds) to complete a course. Jody Avila won the Power Tower round, which was unaired as a result of a legal situation involving his opponent.

Top 12 Competitors
| Rank | Competitor | Time | Furthest Obstacle |
|---|---|---|---|
| 1 | Jody Avila* | 1:44.41 | Finished |
| 2 | Tyler Gillett | 1:45.20 | Finished |
| 3 | Nate Hansen | 1:53.09 | Finished |
| 4 | Jon Alexis Jr. | 2:20.02 | Finished |
| 5 | Julius Ferguson | 3:07.16 | Finished |
| 6 | Mike Wright | 3:45.41 | Finished |
| 7 | Grant McCartney | 4:01.16 | Finished |
| 8 | Allyssa Beird | 4:15.10 | Finished |
| 9 | Flip Rodriguez | 1:13.08 | Slingshot |
| 10 | Jonathan Horton | 1:20.75 | Slingshot |
| 11 | Ryan Lashoff | 1:25.63 | Slingshot |
| 12 | Taylor Johnson | 2:21.53 | Slingshot |

Top 3 Women
| Rank | Competitor | Time | Furthest Obstacle |
|---|---|---|---|
| 1 | Allyssa Beird | 4:15.10 | Finished |
| 2 | Taylor Johnson | 2:21.53 | Slingshot |
| 3 | Sandy Zimmerman | 2:25.07 | Slingshot |

- As a result of United States v. Drechsel, which was announced after taping for the season had ended, significant edits were made to this episode. Drechsel's run did not air. The 13th-place contestant also failed Slingshot but did not advance. Johnson, who finished behind other contestants but was the second-place female ninja, was given credit as the 12th-place finisher. Johnson and Ferguson were rookies selected by Drechsel. Also, the Power Tower Playoff, which was Drechsel and Avila, was not broadcast because of the ongoing legal issues. According to sources, Avila won the round.

=== Night 2 ===
Ashley McConville became the twentieth woman in ANW history to make it up the Warped Wall and move on to the semifinals, and Jake Murray's teammates, former AHL hockey player Barry Goers of the Wilkes-Barre/Scranton Penguins and Glenn Albright moved on to the semifinals due to Murray's win on the Power Tower. Also, the "Eskimo Ninja" Nick Hanson completed the course and made it up the Mega Wall but did not have a fast enough time to make it into the top 12, later to be revealed as contact tracing.

Also of note, second-place finisher Ethan "The Swan" Swanson did not compete in the semifinals after he came in close contact with another competitor who had tested positive for COVID-19.

Top 12 Competitors
| Rank | Competitor | Time | Furthest Obstacle |
|---|---|---|---|
| 1 | Jake Murray | 0:54.50 | Finished |
| 2 | Ethan Swanson | 1:04.14 | Finished |
| 3 | Jackson Twait | 1:13.57 | Finished |
| 4 | Daniel Gil | 1:18.57 | Finished |
| 5 | Cam Baumgartner | 1:20.60 | Finished |
| 6 | Abel Gonzalez | 1:36.75 | Finished |
| 7 | Donovan Metoyer | 1:43.56 | Finished |
| 8 | Jamie Rahn | 1:49.46 | Finished |
| 9 | Chris DiGangi | 1:56.40 | Finished |
| 10 | Gabriel Hotchkiss | 2:06.95 | Finished |
| 11 | Jesse Labreck | 2:10.54 | Finished |
| 12 | Roo Yori | 2:19.71 | Finished |

Top 3 Women
| Rank | Competitor | Time | Furthest Obstacle |
|---|---|---|---|
| 1 | Jesse Labreck | 2:10.54 | Finished |
| 2 | Ashley McConville | 4:26.34 | Finished |
| 3 | Caitlyn Bergstrom | 1:09.22 | Ferris Wheel |

=== Night 3 ===
Stuntwoman Jessie Graff once again completed the course, making it to the end to tie Jesse "Flex" Labreck for the most buzzers among women ninjas with five. Meanwhile, the teammates of drummer R.J. Roman of metal band Emuness, Ben Melick and Jessica Helmer moved on to the semifinals even though they did not complete the course because Roman won the Power Tower.

Despite finishing among the top three women, Rachael Goldstein was unable to compete in the semifinals due to a broken finger which she suffered while filming a special episode of American Ninja Warrior in St. Louis.

Top 12 Competitors
| Rank | Competitor | Time | Furthest Obstacle |
|---|---|---|---|
| 1 | R. J. Roman | 1:10.07 | Finished |
| 2 | Sean Bryan | 1:28.81 | Finished |
| 3 | Thomas Stillings | 1:29.38 | Finished |
| 4 | Austin Gray | 1:34.38 | Finished |
| 5 | Tage Herrington | 2:06.99 | Finished |
| 6 | Dan Polizzi | 2:09.88 | Finished |
| 7 | Najee Richardson | 2:49.36 | Finished |
| 8 | **David Campbell** | 3:27.48 | Finished |
| 9 | Jessie Graff | 3:58.76 | Finished |
| 10 | Adam Rayl | 0:35.17 | Ferris Wheel |
| 11 | Devin Harrelson | 0:56.85 | Ferris Wheel |
| 12 | Lorin Ball | 1:06.59 | Ferris Wheel |

Top 3 Women
| Rank | Competitor | Time | Furthest Obstacle |
|---|---|---|---|
| 1 | Jessie Graff | 3:58.76 | Finished |
| 2 | Zhanique Lovett | 0:32.61 | Spinning Bridge |
| 3 | Rachael Goldstein | 0:30.43 | Beehive |

=== Night 4 ===
"The Weatherman" Joe Moravsky just edged out Michael Torres, who had the fastest time, and brought his teammates, Will Schlageter and Jeshuah Lewis back into the competition. Notable ninjas featured "Big Cat" Karsten Williams, rookie former MLB player of the San Francisco Giants Gary Brown who ran the course, making it to the fifth obstacle. Also, six-time ANW veteran Tiana "Sweet T" Webberley hit the buzzer for the first time, as well as ICU nurse Mady Howard who completed the course with the fastest time for the women.

Top 12 Competitors
| Rank | Competitor | Time | Furthest Obstacle |
|---|---|---|---|
| 1 | Michael Torres | 1:08.75 | Finished |
| 2 | **Joe Moravsky** | 1:13.95 | Finished |
| 3 | Lucas Reale | 1:17.09 | Finished |
| 4 | Mathis “Kid” Owhadi | 1:23.17 | Finished |
| 5 | Amir Malik | 1:26.15 | Finished |
| 6 | David Wright | 1:30.67 | Finished |
| 7 | Lance Pekus | 1:45.62 | Finished |
| 8 | Kevin Bull | 1:57.17 | Finished |
| 9 | Alex Nye | 2:04.69 | Finished |
| 10 | Brian Kretsch | 2:18.44 | Finished |
| 11 | Alex Carson | 2:19.92 | Finished |
| 12 | Verdale Benson | 2:22.29 | Finished |

Top 3 Women
| Rank | Competitor | Time | Furthest Obstacle |
|---|---|---|---|
| 1 | Mady Howard | 2:29.28 | Finished |
| 2 | Tiana Webberley | 2:41.03 | Finished |
| 3 | Meagan Martin | 1:12.35 | Sideways |

=== St. Louis Qualifying Leaderboard ===
Key
Italics means that this competitor was also in the top 3 women.
Underline means that this competitor won the Power Tower.
**Bold** means that this competitor made it up the Mega Wall.

| Rank | Competitor | Time | Furthest Obstacle |
|---|---|---|---|
| 1 | Jake Murray | 0:54.50 | Finished |
| 2 | Ethan Swanson | 1:04.14 | Finished |
| 3 | Michael Torres | 1:08.75 | Finished |
| 4 | R.J. Roman | 1:10.07 | Finished |
| 5 | Jackson Twait | 1:13.57 | Finished |
| 6 | **Joe Moravsky** | 1:13.95 | Finished |
| 7 | Lucas Reale | 1:17.09 | Finished |
| 8 | Daniel Gil | 1:18.57 | Finished |
| 9 | Cameron Baumgartner | 1:20.60 | Finished |
| 10 | Mathis "Kid" Owhadi | 1:23.17 | Finished |
| 11 | Amir Malik | 1:26.15 | Finished |
| 12 | Sean Bryan | 1:26.81 | Finished |
| 13 | Thomas Stillings | 1:29.38 | Finished |
| 14 | David Wright | 1:30.67 | Finished |
| 15 | Austin Gray | 1:34.38 | Finished |
| 16 | Abel Gonzalez | 1:36.75 | Finished |
| 17 | Donovan Metoyer | 1:43.56 | Finished |
| 18 | Jody Avila | 1:44.41 | Finished |
| 19 | Tyler Gillett | 1:45.20 | Finished |
| 20 | Lance Pekus | 1:45.62 | Finished |
| 21 | Jamie Rahn | 1:49.46 | Finished |
| 22 | Nate Hansen | 1:53.09 | Finished |
| 23 | Chris DiGangi | 1:56.40 | Finished |
| 24 | Kevin Bull | 1:57.17 | Finished |
| 25 | Alex Nye | 2:04.69 | Finished |
| 26 | Gabriel Hotchkiss | 2:06.95 | Finished |
| 27 | Tage Herrington | 2:06.99 | Finished |
| 28 | Dan Polizzi | 2:09.88 | Finished |
| 29 | Jesse Labreck | 2:10.54 | Finished |
| 30 | Brian Kretsch | 2:18.44 | Finished |
| 31 | Roo Yori | 2:19.71 | Finished |
| 32 | Alex Carson | 2:19.92 | Finished |
| 33 | Jon Alexis Jr. | 2:20.02 | Finished |
| 34 | Verdale Benson | 2:22.29 | Finished |
| 35 | Najee Richardson | 2:49.36 | Finished |
| 36 | Julius Ferguson | 3:07.16 | Finished |
| 37 | Vance Harris | 3:10.31 | Finished |
| 38 | **David Campbell** | 3:27.48 | Finished |
| 39 | Mike Wright | 3:45.41 | Finished |
| 40 | Jessie Graff | 3:58.76 | Finished |
| 41 | Grant McCartney | 4:01.16 | Finished |
| 42 | Allyssa Beird | 4:15.10 | Finished |
| 43 | **Nick Hanson** | N/A | Finished |
| 44 | Adam Rayl | 0:35.17 | Ferris Wheel |
| 45 | Devin Harrelson | 0:56.85 | Ferris Wheel |
| 46 | Lorin Ball | 1:06.59 | Ferris Wheel |
| 47 | Flip Rodriguez | 1:13.08 | Slingshot |
| 48 | Jonathan Horton | 1:20.75 | Slingshot |
| 49 | Ryan Lashoff | 1:25.63 | Slingshot |
| 50 | Taylor Johnson | 2:21.53 | Slingshot |
| 51 | Barry Goers | N/A | Ferris Wheel |
| 52 | Glenn Albright | N/A | Ferris Wheel |
| 53 | Ben Melick | N/A | Ferris Wheel |
| 54 | Jeshuah Lewis | N/A | Sideways |
| 55 | Will Schlageter | N/A | Beehive |
| 56 | Jessica Helmer | N/A | Shrinking Steps |

Top 12 Women
| Rank | Competitor | Time | Furthest Obstacle |
|---|---|---|---|
| 1 | Jesse Labreck | 2:10.54 | Finished |
| 2 | Mady Howard | 2:29.28 | Finished |
| 3 | Tiana Webberley | 2:41.03 | Finished |
| 4 | Jessie Graff | 3:58.76 | Finished |
| 5 | Allyssa Beird | 4:15.10 | Finished |
| 6 | Ashley McConville | 4:26.34 | Finished |
| 7 | Caitlyn Bergstrom | 1:09.22 | Ferris Wheel |
| 8 | Meagan Martin | 1:12.35 | Sideways |
| 9 | Taylor Johnson | 2:21.53 | Slingshot |
| 10 | Sandy Zimmerman | 2:25.07 | Slingshot |
| 11 | Zhanique Lovett | 0:32.61 | Spinning Bridge |
| 12 | Rachel Goldstein | 0:30.43 | Beehive |

== St. Louis Semifinals ==
=== Night 1 ===
Some notable competitors like Grant McCartney, Kevin Bull, Abel Gonzalez, and Mathis "Kid" Owhadi failed on Corkscrew, an obstacle new to this season, and did not advance to the finals.

Top 12 Competitors
| Rank | Competitor | Time | Furthest Obstacle |
|---|---|---|---|
| 1 | Jake Murray | 4:37.44 | Finished |
| 2 | Daniel Gil | 4:38.58 | Finished |
| 3 | Cameron Baumgartner | 5:30.18 | Finished |
| 4 | Tyler Gillett | 6:20.09 | Finished |
| 5 | Adam Rayl | 6:27.41 | Finished |
| 6 | Jackson Twait | 3:56.67 | Spider Trap |
| 7 | Jody Avila | 2:50.82 | The Dungeon |
| 8 | Donovan Metoyer | 2:59.32 | The Dungeon |
| 9 | Jon Alexis Jr. | 3:07.59 | The Dungeon |
| 10 | Flip Rodriguez | 3:22.35 | The Dungeon |
| 11 | Chris DiGangi | 3:30.35 | The Dungeon |
| 12 | Jamie Rahn | 4:03.01 | The Dungeon |

Top 2 Women
| Rank | Competitor | Time | Furthest Obstacle |
|---|---|---|---|
| 1 | Jesse Labreck | 4:25.54 | The Dungeon |
| 2 | Sandy Zimmerman | 4:55.26 | Corkscrew |

=== Night 2 ===
Top 12 Competitors
| Rank | Competitor | Time | Furthest Obstacle |
|---|---|---|---|
| 1 | Joe Moravsky | 4:59.28 | Finished |
| 2 | Lucas Reale | 5:00.44 | Finished |
| 3 | Austin Gray | 5:20.95 | Finished |
| 4 | RJ Roman | 5:31.00 | Finished |
| 5 | Micheal Torres | 5:52.46 | Finished |
| 6 | Najee Richardson | 6:35.79 | Finished |
| 7 | Amir Malik | 3:58.17 | Spider Trap |
| 8 | David Wright | 3:23.39 | The Dungeon |
| 9 | Dan Polizzi | 4:15.65 | The Dungeon |
| 10 | Thomas Stillings | 2:06.43 | Corkscrew |
| 11 | Jeshuah Lewis | 2:13.26 | Corkscrew |
| 12 | Jessie Graff | 3:54.09 | Corkscrew |

Top 2 Women
| Rank | Competitor | Time | Furthest Obstacle |
|---|---|---|---|
| 1 | Jessie Graff | 3:54.09 | Corkscrew |
| 2 | Jeri D'Aurelio | 2:21.05 | Slingshot |

Drew Drechsel originally finished in the top 12, but due to his post-taping legal issues, his runs were edited out. Devin Harrelson finished 13th, as he was eliminated on the Corkscrew with a faster time exiting the Salmon Ladder than Graff. However, Graff, the top woman who finished outside the top twelve, was upgraded to 12th in post-production.

=== St. Louis Semifinals Leaderboard ===
Top 24 Competitors
| Rank | Competitor | Time | Furthest Obstacle |
|---|---|---|---|
| 1 | Jake Murray | 4:37.44 | Finished |
| 2 | Daniel Gil | 4:38.58 | Finished |
| 3 | Joe Moravsky | 4:59.28 | Finished |
| 4 | Lucas Reale | 5:00.44 | Finished |
| 5 | Austin Gray | 5:20.95 | Finished |
| 6 | Cameron Baumgartner | 5:30.18 | Finished |
| 7 | RJ Roman | 5:31.00 | Finished |
| 8 | Micheal Torres | 5:52.46 | Finished |
| 9 | Tyler Gillett | 6:20.09 | Finished |
| 10 | Adam Rayl | 6:27.41 | Finished |
| 11 | Najee Richardson | 6:35.79 | Finished |
| 12 | Jackson Twait | 3:56.67 | Spider Trap |
| 13 | Amir Malik | 3:58.17 | Spider Trap |
| 14 | Jody Avila | 2:50.82 | The Dungeon |
| 15 | Donovan Metoyer | 2:59.32 | The Dungeon |
| 16 | Jon Alexis Jr. | 3:07.59 | The Dungeon |
| 17 | Flip Rodriguez | 3:22.35 | The Dungeon |
| 18 | David Wright | 3:23.39 | The Dungeon |
| 19 | Chris DiGangi | 3:30.35 | The Dungeon |
| 20 | Jamie Rahn | 4:03.01 | The Dungeon |
| 21 | Dan Polizzi | 4:15.65 | The Dungeon |
| 22 | Thomas Stillings | 2:06.43 | Corkscrew |
| 23 | Jeshuah Lewis | 2:13.26 | Corkscrew |
| 24 | Jessie Graff | 3:54.09 | Corkscrew |

Top 4 Women
| Rank | Competitor | Time | Furthest Obstacle |
|---|---|---|---|
| 1 | Jesse Labreck | 4:25.54 | The Dungeon |
| 2 | Jessie Graff | 3:54.09 | Corkscrew |
| 3 | Sandy Zimmerman | 4:55.26 | Corkscrew |
| 4 | Jeri D'Aurelio | 2:21.05 | Slingshot |

== St. Louis Finals ==
The finals of the show spanned two nights—episode seven, and the beginning of episode eight.

| Rank | Competitor | Time | Furthest Obstacle |
|---|---|---|---|
| 1 | Jake Murray | 3:56.20 | Finished |
| 2 | Daniel Gil | 4:12.68 | Finished |
| 3 | Lucas Reale | 4:33:36 | Finished |
| 4 | Najee Richardson | 4:36:66 | Finished |
| 5 | Austin Gray | 4:40:29 | Finished |
| 6 | Adam Rayl | 6:24.15 | Finished |
| 7 | Jesse Labreck | 7:31.02 | Finished |
| 8 | Amir Malik | 2:40.70 | Dragonback |

=== Power Tower Playoff Bracket ===
The Final 8 competed in a single-elimination tournament format with the top 8 seeded based on their performance in the final. The results are as follows:

Quarterfinals
1 | Jake Murray | Lose
8 | Amir Malik | Win
4 | Najee Richardson | Lose
5 | Austin Gray | Win
2 | Daniel Gil | 35.24
7 | Jesse Labreck | Lose
3 | Lucas Reale | Lose
6 | Adam Rayl | Win

Semifinals
8 | Amir Malik | Lose
5 | Austin Gray | 36.00
2 | Daniel Gil | Win
6 | Adam Rayl | Lose

Final
5 | Austin Gray | Lose
2 | Daniel Gil | 30.13

American Ninja Warrior 12 champion: Daniel Gil

== Broadcast Notes and United States v. Drechsel Case ==
Drew Drechsel, the season eleven champion, participated in this season for the duration of its taping. On July 31, 2020, six days after the taping concluded, the United States Department of Justice formally charged him with four felonies for various crimes in regards to criminal sexual conduct in regards to a complaint filed by a 19-year-old woman to the police in Cherry Hill, New Jersey. Following an August 4 press release by the Department of Justice, NBC cut ties with him, did not air his runs, and prohibited him from appearing in future seasons. They did, however, air the rookies Drechsel chose to compete off-screen. In addition, because Drechsel competed on the Power Tower in episode one (losing to "Big Dog Ninja" Jody Avila), the Power Tower competition that Avila won was not aired. Fellow ninja Joe Moravsky stated on a Twitch stream that Drechsel didn't make it to the Power Tower Playoffs.

On June 1, 2023, Mr. Dreschel pled guilty to one count of child pornography and one count of enticing travel for sexual conduct. Sentencing was originally scheduled for October 24, 2023. On June 26, 2024, at 2:37 PM local time, Drechsel was sentenced to 121 months in prison (just over 10 years) followed by 15 years of supervised release along with lifetime sex offender registration and USD$100,000 in restitution. Judge Renee Bumb called Drechsel a "dangerous predator" during the sentencing proceedings. He is imprisoned at Federal Correctional Institution, Milan in Michigan, where he is imprisoned until 2029.

== Ratings ==
| Episode | | Air Date | Timeslot (ET) | Rating/Share (18–49) | Viewers (millions) |
|---|---|---|---|---|---|
| 1 | Qualifiers #1 | September 7, 2020 | Monday 8:00 PM | 0.6 | 3.66 |
| 2 | Qualifiers #2 | September 14, 2020 | Monday 8:00 PM | 0.5 | 3.18 |
| 3 | Qualifiers #3 | September 21, 2020 | Monday 8:00 PM | 0.5 | 3.48 |
| 4 | Qualifiers #4 | October 5, 2020 | Monday 9:00 PM | 0.4 | 2.22 |
| 5 | Semifinals #1 | October 12, 2020 | Monday 8:00 PM | 0.6 | 3.09 |
| 6 | Semifinals #2 | October 21, 2020 | Wednesday 9:00 PM | 0.5 | 2.58 |
| 7 | Finals #1 | October 28, 2020 | Wednesday 9:00 PM | 0.5 | 2.94 |
| 8 | Finals #2 | November 6, 2020 | Friday 8:00 PM | 0.5 | 2.97 |
