= American Ninja Warrior season 13 =

Season of American reality/sport competition television series American Ninja Warrior

American Ninja Warrior
- Season 13
- Hosted by: Matt Iseman; Akbar Gbaja-Biamila; Zuri Hall
- No. of episodes: 12

Release
- Original network: NBC
- Original release: May 31 – September 13, 2021

Season chronology
- ← Previous; Season 12 Next → Season 14

The thirteenth season of American Ninja Warrior premiered on May 31, 2021 on NBC. The season contain 12 episodes. A spin-off from the Japanese reality series Sasuke, it is hosted by Matt Iseman, Akbar Gbaja-Biamila, and Zuri Hall. As with the twelfth season, this season used a smaller number of filming locations with no audiences during taping due to the COVID-19 pandemic.

The series was announced in November 2020, a few weeks after the previous season finished airing. Applications were officially being accepted that month. The series was also a full season, as opposed to the shortened, 8-episode season seen in 2020 due to the COVID-19 pandemic. Filming took place entirely in Seattle/Tacoma and Los Angeles, California, with the national finals filming back in Las Vegas, Nevada. The Grand Prize and the Last Ninja Standing reward were restored, as $1,000,000 and $100,000, respectively. Kaden Lebsack, 15, was Last Ninja Standing, winning the $100,000 first prize after narrowly missing out on the grand prize in the rope climb.

Starting with this season, the age requirement dropped from 19 years old to 15. Competitors also included "family" teams of three, with at least one teenager 15 to 19 years old, with each member competing on two obstacles. Filming for the season began in March 2021 and casting took place between November 22 to December 14, 2020. The full cast of competitors was announced in January 2021. The season introduced "Split Decision", in which competitors could choose one of two obstacles to do for the third obstacle in qualifying courses and the ninth obstacle in semifinal courses. In the National Finals, Split Decision occurred on the eighth and final obstacle of Stage One.

== Obstacles ==
=== Seattle/Tacoma Qualifying ===
Event	Obstacles						Finishers
Night 1	Shrinking Steps	Overpass	Domino Effect	Tipping Point	V Formation	Warped Wall/Mega Wall	5
Night 1	Shrinking Steps	Overpass	Spinning Log	Tipping Point	V Formation	Warped Wall/Mega Wall	5
Night 2	Shrinking Steps	Weight for It	Broken Bridge	Tipping Point	V Formation	Warped Wall/Mega Wall	7
Night 2	Shrinking Steps	Weight for It	Burn Rubber	Tipping Point	V Formation	Warped Wall/Mega Wall	7
Night 3	Shrinking Steps	Overpass	Domino Effect	Air Surfer	Pretzel Twist	Warped Wall/Mega Wall	12
Night 3	Shrinking Steps	Overpass	Spinning Log	Air Surfer	Pretzel Twist	Warped Wall/Mega Wall	12
Night 4	Shrinking Steps	Double Down	Log Runner	Air Surfer	Pretzel Twist	Warped Wall/Mega Wall	13
Night 4	Shrinking Steps	Double Down	Block Run	Air Surfer	Pretzel Twist	Warped Wall/Mega Wall	13
Night 5	Shrinking Steps	Double Down	Log Runner	Tilt-A-Whirl	Sideways	Warped Wall/Mega Wall	18
Night 5	Shrinking Steps	Double Down	Block Run	Tilt-A-Whirl	Sideways	Warped Wall/Mega Wall	18

=== Los Angeles Semifinals ===
Event	Obstacles										Finishers
Night 1	Shrinking Steps	Lunatic Ledges	Tilt-A-Whirl	Spinning Bridge	Wall to Wall	Warped Wall	Salmon Ladder	Corkscrew	Inverter	Spider Trap	4
Night 1	Shrinking Steps	Lunatic Ledges	Tilt-A-Whirl	Spinning Bridge	Wall to Wall	Warped Wall	Salmon Ladder	Corkscrew	Tuning Forks	Spider Trap	4
Night 2	Shrinking Steps	Double Twister	Ring Chaser	Spinning Bridge	Wall to Wall	Warped Wall	Salmon Ladder	Padlock	Inverter	Spider Trap	5
Night 2	Shrinking Steps	Double Twister	Ring Chaser	Spinning Bridge	Wall to Wall	Warped Wall	Salmon Ladder	Padlock	Tuning Forks	Spider Trap	5
Night 3	Shrinking Steps	Double Twister	Ring Chaser	Diamond Dash	Drop Zone	Warped Wall	Salmon Ladder	Padlock	The Dungeon	Spider Trap	6
Night 3	Shrinking Steps	Double Twister	Ring Chaser	Diamond Dash	Drop Zone	Warped Wall	Salmon Ladder	Padlock	Diving Boards	Spider Trap	6
Night 4	Shrinking Steps	Lunatic Ledges	Barrel Roll	Diamond Dash	Drop Zone	Warped Wall	Salmon Ladder	Crazy Clocks	The Dungeon	Spider Trap	12
Night 4	Shrinking Steps	Lunatic Ledges	Barrel Roll	Diamond Dash	Drop Zone	Warped Wall	Salmon Ladder	Crazy Clocks	Diving Boards	Spider Trap	12

=== Las Vegas National Finals ===
Event	Obstacle(s)								Finishers
Stage 1	Slide Surfer	Swinging Blades	Double Dipper	Jumping Spider	Tire Run	Warped Wall	Dipping Birds	**The High Road**	**27**
Stage 1	Slide Surfer	Swinging Blades	Double Dipper	Jumping Spider	Tire Run	Warped Wall	Dipping Birds	**Fly Hooks**	**27**
Stage 2	Striding Steps	Double Salmon Ladder	V Formation	Hammer Drop	Epic Air Surfer	Falling Shelves			**4**
Stage 3	Grip & Tip	Stalactites	Up For Grabs	Ultimate Cliffhanger	Pipe Dream	Eyeglass Alley	Flying Bar		**1**
Stage 4	Rope Climb								**0**

Bold indicates Split-Decision obstacles and completing the Mega Wall awarded $10,000 to the competitor.

== Seattle/Tacoma Qualifying ==
The qualifiers took place at the Tacoma Dome in Seattle/Tacoma. Athletes who conquered the 18-foot Mega Wall in bold and women who finished in the top 30 in italics.

=== Night 1 ===
The first qualifying round featured three new obstacles: Overpass, Tipping Point, and V Formation, along with 'Split-Decision' (Domino Effect & Spinning Log). Notable ninjas running the course included NASCAR driver Jade Buford, two-time Olympic basketball gold medalist Ruthie Bolton, and 2008 Olympic gymnast Jonathan Horton was back for his 6th season.

This episode set a record for the fewest finishers in a qualifying episode with only 5. Notable ninjas who did not advance were Mathis "Kid" Owhadi, Thomas Stillings, Barclay Stockett (who returned after missing Season 12), Maggi Thorne, Jeri D'Aurelio, Casey Shuchocki, Nate Burkhalter, Quest O'Neal, John Loobey, and Ben Wilson.

Top 30 Competitors
Rank	Competitor	Time	Furthest Obstacle
1	Isaiah Thomas	2:16.67	Finished
2	Elijah Browning	2:19.19	Finished
3	Jody Avila	2:25.97	Finished
4	Vinnie Castranova	2:42.84	Finished
5	Jonathan Godbout	3:02.24	Finished
6	Nate Pardo	1:14.66	V Formation
7	Daniel Gil	1:16.54	V Formation
8	Christian Youst	1:16.78	V Formation
9	Brian Burkhardt	1:18.00	V Formation
10	Alex Blick	1:19.35	V Formation
11	Caleb Dowden	1:23.54	V Formation
12	Ryan Meeks	1:23.85	V Formation
13	Isaiah Wakeham	1:26.06	V Formation
14	Cole Verble	1:26.92	V Formation
15	Isabella Wakeham	1:27.04	V Formation
16	Josh Norton	1:32.13	V Formation
17	Caleb Benson	1:32.47	V Formation
18	Wade Lopp	1:34.81	V Formation
19	Karman Selby	1:37.09	V Formation
20	Dan Wentworth	1:38.19	V Formation
21	Bryan Billngmeier	1:39.44	V Formation
22	Adam Naids	1:47.68	V Formation
23	Jeremy Clark	1:56.78	V Formation
24	Abel Gonzalez	2:01.46	V Formation
25	Lindsay Eskildsen	2:11.01	V Formation
26	Sam Sann	2:14.57	V Formation
27	Sophie Shaft	0:47.91	Tipping Point
28	Jonathan Horton	0:56.82	Tipping Point
29	Jade Buford	0:59.71	Tipping Point
30	Cory Torkelson	1:01.25	Tipping Point

Top 5 Women
Rank	Competitor	Time	Furthest Obstacle
1	Isabella Wakeham	1:27.04	V Formation
2	Lindsay Eskildsen	2:11.01	V Formation
3	Sophie Shaft	0:47.91	Tipping Point
4	Chynna Hart	0:27.41	Domino Effect
5	Christie Brophy	0:30.66	Domino Effect

Akbar's Gbajabia-Moments
Rank	Competitor	Reason for inclusion	Furthest Obstacle
1	Nikki Asirvadam	Disguised as a horse, who loves Michael Jackson.	Shrinking Steps
2	Dana Kielar	Got a beloved horse watching from the barn.	Overpass
3	Juliana Wilson	Former Mrs. Tennessee as a pageant winner.	Shrinking Steps

=== Night 2 ===
The second qualifying round featured the same course as the first qualifier, but with two new Split-Decision obstacles: Broken Bridge and Burn Rubber. Overpass was switched out with Weight For It from season 12. Notable ninjas running the course were former Olympic hurdler David "Crush" Payne and Alex Weber, the host of American Ninja Warrior: Crashing the Course award-winning web-series.

This was also the first time in the show's history where 5 women finished in the Top 30. Also, "The Weatherman" Joe Moravsky was the first to make it up the 18-foot Mega Wall this season.

Top 30 Competitors
Rank	Competitor	Time	Furthest Obstacle
1	Kaden Lebsack	1:49.09	Finished
2	Lucas Reale	2:02.89	Finished
3	**Joe Moravsky**	2:04.10	Finished (Mega Wall)
4	Josiah Pippel	2:53.76	Finished
5	Anthony Porter	3:01.48	Finished
6	Victor Chan	3:06.58	Finished
7	Dan Champagne	3:43.59	Finished
8	Julius Ferguson	0:59.93	V Formation
9	True Becker	1:02.57	V Formation
10	Mike Beadle	1:06.34	V Formation
11	Lance Pekus	1:16.78	V Formation
12	Michael Larlee	1:18.04	V Formation
13	Cody Johnston	1:18.89	V Formation
14	Ruben Arellano	1:23.46	V Formation
15	Vincent Pane	1:23.87	V Formation
16	Xavier Dantzler	1:29.12	V Formation
17	Jason Grossman	1:40.24	V Formation
18	Jonah Bonner	2:08.17	V Formation
19	Zhanique Lovett	2:14.49	V Formation
20	Will Schlageter	2:16.78	V Formation
21	DC Banks	2:24.11	V Formation
22	Jose Gomez	2:30.46	V Formation
23	Sandy Zimmerman	2:31.62	V Formation
24	Deren Perez	2:47.57	V Formation
25	Francisco Barajas	0:48.99	Tipping Point
26	Sophia Lavallee	0:59.76	Tipping Point
27	Perry Madison	1:02.13	Tipping Point
28	Brian Montagnese	1:06.13	Tipping Point
29	Brittney Durant	1:07.70	Tipping Point
30	Tiana Webberley	1:08.34	Tipping Point

Top 5 Women
Rank	Competitor	Time	Furthest Obstacle
1	Zhanique Lovett	2:14.49	V Formation
2	Sandy Zimmerman	2:31.62	V Formation
3	Sophia Lavallee	0:59.76	Tipping Point
4	Brittney Durant	1:07.70	Tipping Point
5	Tiana Webberley	1:08.34	Tipping Point

Akbar's Gbajabia-Moments
Rank	Competitor	Reason for inclusion	Furthest Obstacle
1	Zac Palazzo	Lit it up outside the Tacoma Dome, as a fire breather and a carpenter.	Tipping Point
2	Melissa Jackson	Got warmed up by taking a long ride on her unicycle.	Weight for it
3	Emmanuel McConnell	As a Spartan Ninja, he looked ready for war.	Shrinking Steps

=== Night 3 ===
In this episode, two new obstacles were introduced: Air Surfer and Pretzel Twist. Notable ninjas running the course were former Olympic speed skater K.C. Boutiette, freestyle motocross rider Zach DiPaolo, and former pro wakeboarder Austin Hair. Two rookies, 19-year-old Brett Hernandez Strong and 16-year-old Vance Walker (a two-time American Ninja Warrior Junior winner), both scaled the Mega Wall.

Notable ninjas who didn't advance were Grant McCartney ("Island Ninja"), Nick Hanson ("Eskimo Ninja"), one half of the "Towers of Power" Brandon Mears, who after falling on his fifth balance obstacle in the past five seasons, announced his possible retirement, Bootie Coothran, Grace Sims, and Michelle Warnky Buurma after falling in the 3rd obstacle.

Top 30 Competitors
Rank	Competitor	Time	Furthest Obstacle
1	R.J. Roman	1:39.84	Finished
2	Amir Malik	1:51.11	Finished
3	Enzo DeFerrari Wilson	2:19.92	Finished
4	Owen Dyer	2:23.13	Finished
5	Kevin Carbone	2:33.09	Finished
6	Max Feinberg	2:35.42	Finished
7	Austin Hair	2:39.62	Finished
8	**Brett Hernandez Strong**	2:53.07	Finished (Mega Wall)
9	Dan Polizzi	3:04.96	Finished
10	**Vance Walker**	3:07.32	Finished (Mega Wall)
11	Brett Sims	3:37.52	Finished
12	Tyler Gillett	4:02.22	Finished
13	WeiWei Qin	1:00.61	Pretzel Twist
14	Nico Gentry	1:04.78	Pretzel Twist
15	Devin Harrelson	1:06.10	Pretzel Twist
16	Kenny Tran	1:06.45	Pretzel Twist
17	Shaq Leach	1:06.89	Pretzel Twist
18	DeShawn Harris	1:09.25	Pretzel Twist
19	Josh Wagg	1:11.81	Pretzel Twist
20	Ben Whitlow	1:13.49	Pretzel Twist
21	Josiah Singleton	1:14.57	Pretzel Twist
22	Bob Reese	1:19.58	Pretzel Twist
23	Brad Giles	1:21.44	Pretzel Twist
24	Todd Bourgeois	1:24.76	Pretzel Twist
25	KC Boutiette	1:26.71	Pretzel Twist
26	Glenn Davis	1:45.78	Pretzel Twist
27	Alyssa Varsalona	1:56.43	Pretzel Twist
28	Charity LeBlanc	2:13.99	Pretzel Twist
29	Tony Miles	2:30.50	Pretzel Twist
30	Lenny Lopez	0:34.22	Air Surfer

Top 5 Women
Rank	Competitor	Time	Furthest Obstacle
1	Alyssa Varsalona	1:56.43	Pretzel Twist
2	Charity LeBlanc	2:13.99	Pretzel Twist
3	Megan Budway	0:46.18	Air Surfer
4	Cara Mack	0:47.56	Air Surfer
5	Heather Weissinger	0:58.76	Air Surfer

Akbar's Gbajabia-Moments
Rank	Competitor	Reason for inclusion	Furthest Obstacle
1	Tony Miles	He bet $75 000 that he completes the course, but missed.	Pretzel Twist; qualified
2	Jessica Helmer	She rescues abandoned rabbits, and she let Zuri Hall bunny sit during her run.	Shrinking Steps
3	Josh Wagg	The Death Metal Ninja had plenty of swag	Pretzel Twist; qualified

=== Night 4 ===
Another new obstacle was introduced, called Double Down. Notable ninjas running the course were super-lightweight champion professional boxer Melissa St. Vil, former NFL player Andrew East (trained by his wife, Olympic gold-medal gymnast Shawn Johnson), and PLL lacrosse player Rob Pannell. However, schoolteacher Allyssa Beird was among the notable competitors who failed to advance to the semifinals.

With Lorin Ball absent for season 13, veterans David Campbell and Brian Kretsch became the only two competitors to have appeared on every single season of American Ninja Warrior.

Additionally, this was only the second time five women made the top 30.

Top 30 Competitors
Rank	Competitor	Time	Furthest Obstacle
1	Jake Murray	1:47.20	Finished
2	Sean Bryan	1:54.38	Finished
3	Ethan Swanson	1:56.63	Finished
4	Nate Hansen	2:03.53	Finished
5	Matt Bradley	2:19.37	Finished
6	Caiden Madzelan	2:34.35	Finished
7	Jay Lewis	2:37.53	Finished
8	Jonah Munoz	2:46.35	Finished
9	Tage Herrington	3:11.82	Finished
10	Adam Rayl	3:21.44	Finished
11	David Campbell	4:30.12	Finished
12	Luke Dillon	4:45.00	Finished
13	Meagan Martin	5:56.49	Finished
14	Austin Gray	0:57.68	Pretzel Twist
15	Devan Alexander	0:59.77	Pretzel Twist
16	Addy Herman	1:13.46	Pretzel Twist
17	Mike Wright	1:16.87	Pretzel Twist
18	Chad Flexington	1:19.24	Pretzel Twist
19	John Uga	1:23.21	Pretzel Twist
20	Alex Begolly	1:26.77	Pretzel Twist
21	Logan Kreglow	1:30.54	Pretzel Twist
22	Abby Clark	1:33.02	Pretzel Twist
23	Quinn Nguyen	1:33.56	Pretzel Twist
24	Luciano Acuna Jr.	1:46.78	Pretzel Twist
25	Anthony Eardley	1:56.07	Pretzel Twist
26	Paul Fisher	1:58.97	Pretzel Twist
27	Casey Rothschild	2:01.12	Pretzel Twist
28	Judas Licciardello	2:02.57	Pretzel Twist
29	Rachel Degutz	2:05.67	Pretzel Twist
30	Brian Kretsch	2:13.45	Pretzel Twist

Top 5 Women
Rank	Competitor	Time	Furthest Obstacle
1	Meagan Martin	5:56.49	Finished
2	Addy Herman	1:13.46	Pretzel Twist
3	Abby Clark	1:33.02	Pretzel Twist
4	Casey Rothschild	2:01.12	Pretzel Twist
5	Rachel Degutz	2:05.67	Pretzel Twist

Akbar's Gbajabia-Moments
Rank	Competitor	Reason for inclusion	Furthest Obstacle
1	John Huie	He led his entire middle school orchestra in a starline syndal.	Double Down
2	Bryan "Muscle" Mendez	His mom made the hosts Authentic Salvadoran Pupusas.	Air Surfer
3	Aubry Marie	She showed the flexibility that has made her a social media sensation.	Double Down

=== Night 5 ===
Another new obstacle was introduced, this one called Tilt-A-Whirl. Among the notable ninjas was former NFL quarterback Jake Heaps. Brian Beckstrand and his son, Kai (who previously competed on American Ninja Warrior Junior), became the first ever father-and-son duo to hit the buzzer in the qualifying round. The "Cat Daddy", Jackson Twait, made it up the Mega Wall. Jesse "Flex" Labreck joined Meagan Martin as one of only two women to hit a buzzer in the qualifying round this season. One competitor from this episode, Nick Hanson (who made it to Sideways), is a different Nick Hanson from the "Eskimo Ninja"; his nickname is the "Rugby Ninja".

Among the notable veteran ninjas not advancing to the semifinals was Labreck's fiancé, Chris DiGangi, as well as Michael Torres.

Top 30 Competitors
Rank	Competitor	Time	Furthest Obstacle
1	Kai Beckstrand	1:36.83	Finished
2	Cal Plohoros	1:51.49	Finished
3	Tyler Yamauchi	1:53.17	Finished
4	Cam Baumgartner	1:55.19	Finished
5	**Jackson Twait**	1:57.59	Finished (Mega Wall)
6	Joe Meissner	1:58.66	Finished
7	Kyle Soderman	2:03.04	Finished
8	Hunter Guerard	2:04.83	Finished
9	Chris Behrends	2:11.04	Finished
10	John Mack	2:23.55	Finished
11	Eric Middleton	2:59.31	Finished
12	Sam Folsom	3:03.63	Finished
13	Mike Silenzi	3:15.54	Finished
14	Philip Scott	3:16.15	Finished
15	Brian Beckstrand	3:23.67	Finished
16	Joe Brown	3:43.52	Finished
17	Jesse Labreck	3:50.65	Finished
18	Jamie Rahn	4:03.15	Finished
19	Flip Rodriguez	0:57.61	Sideways
20	Donovan Metoyer	1:02.14	Sideways
21	Ben Martin	1:03.57	Sideways
22	Nick Hanson	1:06.44	Sideways
23	Sem Garay	1:08.94	Sideways
24	Marquez Green	1:12.24	Sideways
25	Roo Yori	1:12.56	Sideways
26	Jason Barber	1:12.78	Sideways
27	Andrew Stoinski	1:13.00	Sideways
28	Marcelino Riley	1:14.42	Sideways
29	Nathan Green	1:14.79	Sideways
30	Kyle Schulze	1:18.91	Sideways

Top 5 Women
Rank	Competitor	Time	Furthest Obstacle
1	Jesse Labreck	3:50.65	Finished
2	Megan Rowe	1:23.46	Sideways
3	Taylor Amann	1:31.35	Sideways
4	Jamie Ross	1:39.43	Sideways
5	Ava Colasanti	1:02.73	Tilt-A-Whirl

Akbar's Gbajabia-Moments
Rank	Competitor	Reason for inclusion	Furthest Obstacle
1	Eric Middleton	He brought the hosts a plate of tomato hornworms to eat if he finished the course.	Clear (2:59.31)
2	Mike Silenzi	He had fellow Chicago Ninjas (Jesse Labreck, Chris DiGangi and Tyler Yamauchi) galloping on fake horses to represent his nickname "The Stallion".	Clear (3:15.54)
3	Trinnie Bush	From the plains of Kansas, she looked like a character from little house on the prairie.	Shrinking Steps

=== Seattle/Tacoma Qualifying Leaderboard ===
Top 150 Competitors
Rank	Competitor	Time	Furthest Obstacle
1	Kai Beckstrand	1:36.83	Finished
2	R.J. Roman	1:39.84	Finished
3	Jake Murray	1:47.20	Finished
4	Kaden Lebsack	1:49.09	Finished
5	Amir Malik	1:51.11	Finished
6	Cal Plohoros	1:51.49	Finished
7	Tyler Yamauchi	1:53.17	Finished
8	Sean Bryan	1:54.38	Finished
9	Cam Baumgartner	1:55.19	Finished
10	Ethan Swanson	1:56.63	Finished
11	**Jackson Twait**	1:57.59	Finished (Mega Wall)
12	Joe Meissner	1:58.66	Finished
13	Lucas Reale	2:02.89	Finished
14	Kyle Soderman	2:03.04	Finished
15	Nate Hansen	2:03.53	Finished
16	**Joe Moravsky**	2:04.10	Finished (Mega Wall)
17	Hunter Guerard	2:04.83	Finished
18	Chris Behrends	2:11.04	Finished
19	Isaiah Thomas	2:16.67	Finished
20	Elijah Browning	2:19.19	Finished
21	Matt Bradley	2:19.37	Finished
22	Enzo DeFerrari Wilson	2:19.92	Finished
23	Owen Dyer	2:23.13	Finished
24	John Mack	2:23.55	Finished
25	Jody Avila	2:25.97	Finished
26	Kevin Carbone	2:33.09	Finished
27	Caiden Madzelan	2:34.35	Finished
28	Max Feinberg	2:35.42	Finished
29	Jay Lewis	2:37.53	Finished
30	Austin Hair	2:39.62	Finished
31	Vinnie Castranova	2:42.84	Finished
32	Jonah Munoz	2:46.35	Finished
33	**Brett Hernandez Strong**	2:53.07	Finished (Mega Wall)
34	Josiah Pippel	2:53.76	Finished
35	Eric Middleton	2:59.31	Finished
36	Anthony Porter	3:01.48	Finished
37	Jonathan Godbout	3:02.24	Finished
38	Sam Folsom	3:03.63	Finished
39	Dan Polizzi	3:04.96	Finished
40	Victor Chan	3:06.58	Finished
41	**Vance Walker**	3:07.32	Finished (Mega Wall)
42	Tage Herrington	3:11.82	Finished
43	Mike Silenzi	3:15.54	Finished
44	Philip Scott	3:16.15	Finished
45	Adam Rayl	3:21.44	Finished
46	Brian Beckstrand	3:23.67	Finished
47	Brett Sims	3:37.52	Finished
48	Joe Brown	3:43.52	Finished
49	Dan Champagne	3:43.59	Finished
50	Jesse Labreck	3:50.65	Finished
51	Tyler Gillett	4:02.22	Finished
52	Jamie Rahn	4:03.15	Finished
53	David Campbell	4:30.12	Finished
54	Luke Dillon	4:45.00	Finished
55	Meagan Martin	5:56.49	Finished
56	Flip Rodriguez	0:57.61	Sideways
57	Austin Gray	0:57.68	Pretzel Twist
58	Devan Alexander	0:59.77	Pretzel Twist
59	Julius Ferguson	0:59.93	V Formation
60	WeiWei Qin	1:00.61	Pretzel Twist
61	Donovan Metoyer	1:02.14	Sideways
62	True Becker	1:02.57	V Formation
63	Ben Martin	1:03.57	Sideways
64	Nico Gentry	1:04.78	Pretzel Twist
65	Devin Harrelson	1:06.10	Pretzel Twist
66	Mike Beadle	1:06.34	V Formation
67	Nick Hanson	1:06.44	Sideways
68	Kenny Tran	1:06.45	Pretzel Twist
69	Shaq Leach	1:06.89	Pretzel Twist
70	Sem Garay	1:08.94	Sideways
71	DeShawn Harris	1:09.25	Pretzel Twist
72	Josh Wagg	1:11.81	Pretzel Twist
73	Marquez Green	1:12.24	Sideways
74	Roo Yori	1:12.56	Sideways
75	Jason Barber	1:12.78	Sideways
76	Andrew Stoinski	1:13.00	Sideways
77	Addy Herman	1:13.46	Pretzel Twist
78	Ben Whitlow	1:13.49	Pretzel Twist
79	Marcelino Riley	1:14.42	Sideways
80	Josiah Singleton	1:14.57	Pretzel Twist
81	Nate Pardo	1:14.66	V Formation
82	Nathan Green	1:14.79	Sideways
83	Daniel Gil	1:16.54	V Formation
84	Christian Youst	1:16.78	V Formation
85	Lance Pekus	1:16.78	V Formation
86	Mike Wright	1:16.87	Pretzel Twist
87	Brian Burkhardt	1:18.00	V Formation
88	Michael Larlee	1:18.04	V Formation
89	Cody Johnston	1:18.89	V Formation
90	Kyle Schulze	1:18.91	Sideways
91	Chad Flexington	1:19.24	Pretzel Twist
92	Alex Blick	1:19.35	V Formation
93	Bob Reese	1:19.58	Pretzel Twist
94	Brad Giles	1:21.44	Pretzel Twist
95	John Uga	1:23.21	Pretzel Twist
96	Ruben Arellano	1:23.46	V Formation
97	Caleb Dowden	1:23.54	V Formation
98	Ryan Meeks	1:23.85	V Formation
99	Vincent Pane	1:23.87	V Formation
100	Todd Bourgeois	1:24.76	Pretzel Twist
101	Isaiah Wakeham	1:26.06	V Formation
102	KC Boutiette	1:26.71	Pretzel Twist
103	Alex Begolly	1:26.77	Pretzel Twist
104	Cole Verble	1:26.92	V Formation
105	Isabella Wakeham	1:27.04	V Formation
106	Xavier Dantzler	1:29.12	V Formation
107	Logan Kreglow	1:30.54	Pretzel Twist
108	Josh Norton	1:32.13	V Formation
109	Caleb Benson	1:32.47	V Formation
110	Abby Clark	1:33.02	Pretzel Twist
111	Quinn Nguyen	1:33.56	Pretzel Twist
112	Wade Lopp	1:34.81	V Formation
113	Karman Selby	1:37.09	V Formation
114	Dan Wentworth	1:38.19	V Formation
115	Bryan Billngmeier	1:39.44	V Formation
116	Jason Grossman	1:40.24	V Formation
117	Glenn Davis	1:45.78	Pretzel Twist
118	Luciano Acuna Jr.	1:46.78	Pretzel Twist
119	Adam Naids	1:47.68	V Formation
120	Anthony Eardley	1:56.07	Pretzel Twist
121	Alyssa Varsalona	1:56.43	Pretzel Twist
122	Jeremy Clark	1:56.78	V Formation
123	Paul Fisher	1:58.97	Pretzel Twist
124	Casey Rothschild	2:01.12	Pretzel Twist
125	Abel Gonzalez	2:01.46	V Formation
126	Judas Licciardello	2:02.57	Pretzel Twist
127	Rachel Degutz	2:05.67	Pretzel Twist
128	Jonah Bonner	2:08.17	V Formation
129	Lindsay Eskildsen	2:11.01	V Formation
130	Brian Kretsch	2:13.45	Pretzel Twist
131	Charity LeBlanc	2:13.99	Pretzel Twist
132	Zhanique Lovett	2:14.49	V Formation
133	Sam Sann	2:14.57	V Formation
134	Will Schlageter	2:16.78	V Formation
135	DC Banks	2:24.11	V Formation
136	Jose Gomez	2:30.46	V Formation
137	Tony Miles	2:30.50	Pretzel Twist
138	Sandy Zimmerman	2:31.62	V Formation
139	Deren Perez	2:47.57	V Formation
140	Sophie Shaft	0:47.91	Tipping Point
141	Francisco Barajas	0:48.99	Tipping Point
142	Jonathan Horton	0:56.82	Tipping Point
143	Jade Buford	0:59.71	Tipping Point
144	Sophia Lavallee	0:59.76	Tipping Point
145	Cory Torkelson	1:01.25	Tipping Point
146	Perry Madison	1:02.13	Tipping Point
147	Brian Montagnese	1:06.13	Tipping Point
148	Brittney Durant	1:07.70	Tipping Point
149	Tiana Webberley	1:08.34	Tipping Point
150	Lenny Lopez	0:34.22	Air Surfer

Top 25 Women
Rank	Competitor	Time	Furthest Obstacle
1	Jesse Labreck	3:50.65	Finished
2	Meagan Martin	5:56.49	Finished
3	Addy Herman	1:13.46	Pretzel Twist
4	Megan Rowe	1:23.46	Sideways
5	Isabella Wakeham	1:27.04	V Formation
6	Taylor Amann	1:31.35	Sideways
7	Abby Clark	1:33.02	Pretzel Twist
8	Jamie Ross	1:39.43	Sideways
9	Alyssa Varsalona	1:56.43	Pretzel Twist
10	Casey Rothschild	2:01.12	Pretzel Twist
11	Rachel Degutz	2:05.67	Pretzel Twist
12	Lindsay Eskildsen	2:11.01	V Formation
13	Charity LeBlanc	2:13.99	Pretzel Twist
14	Zhanique Lovett	2:14.49	V Formation
15	Sandy Zimmerman	2:31.62	V Formation
16	Megan Budway	0:46.18	Air Surfer
17	Cara Mack	0:47.56	Air Surfer
18	Sophie Shaft	0:47.91	Tipping Point
19	Heather Weissinger	0:58.76	Air Surfer
20	Sophia Lavallee	0:59.76	Tipping Point
21	Ava Colasanti	1:02.73	Tilt-A-Whirl
22	Brittney Durant	1:07.70	Tipping Point
23	Tiana Webberley	1:08.34	Tipping Point
24	Chynna Hart	0:27.41	Domino Effect
25	Christie Brophy	0:30.66	Domino Effect

== Los Angeles Semifinals ==
The show moved to Los Angeles, California for the semifinals, which took place on the lot of Universal Studios Hollywood. The Power Tower returned here, where the top two finishers would face off for the chance to win a Safety Pass (which would allow for a do-over of stage 1 or 2 of the Finals if necessary). Contestants who won the Power Tower race are indicated in green. Women in the top 15 italics.

=== Night 1 ===
Two new obstacles were introduced, the first of which was the 5th obstacle, called Wall to Wall. Split Decision was moved to the back half of the course as the 9th obstacle, and here, competitors had a choice between another new obstacle, an upper-body obstacle called the Inverter, or a balance obstacle, the Tuning Forks.

Top 15 Competitors
Rank	Competitor	Time	Furthest Obstacle
1	Daniel Gil*	4:40.11	Finished
2	Brian Burkhardt	7:18.59	Finished
3	Max Feinberg	7:19.90	Finished
4	Abel Gonzalez	7:27.06	Finished
5	Owen Dyer	3:26.97	Tuning Forks
6	Deren Perez	3:55.74	Tuning Forks
7	Ryan Meeks	4:21.35	Inverter
8	Isaiah Thomas	4:21.70	Tuning Forks
9	Christian Youst	4:26.91	Inverter
10	Elijah Browning	4:27.19	Inverter
11	Isaiah Wakeham	4:32.10	Inverter
12	Anthony Porter	4:51.54	Inverter
13	Lance Pekus	4:57.18	Inverter
14	Isabella Wakeham	5:47.35	Inverter
15	Tiana Webberley	5:52.01	Tuning Forks

Top 3 Women
Rank	Competitor	Time	Furthest Obstacle
1	Isabella Wakeham	5:47.35	Inverter
2	Tiana Webberley	5:52.01	Tuning Forks
3	Zhanique Lovett	0:28.72	Tilt-A-Whirl

- *Following the taping of this episode, but before the Finals in Las Vegas, Daniel Gil withdrew as a result of a positive coronavirus test and was unable to participate in the finals. Jody Avila, the sixteenth place player, was added. Coincidentally, Avila won an unaired Power Tower in season 12 that did not air because of a federal investigation involving Drew Dreschel, who achieved Total Victory in season 11.

=== Night 2 ===
Another new obstacle was introduced in the back half of the course, Padlock.

Top 15 Competitors
Rank	Competitor	Time	Furthest Obstacle
1	Jay Lewis	3:54.05	Finished
2	Joe Moravsky	4:09.86	Finished
3	Kaden Lebsack	4:13.92	Finished
4	True Becker	4:44.29	Finished
5	Amir Malik	5:04.79	Finished
6	Dan Champagne	5:11.40	Inverter
7	Rachel Degutz	6:05.80	Tuning Forks
8	Jackson Twait	1:43.38	Padlock
9	Chris Behrends	2:03.17	Padlock
10	Brett Hernandez Strong	2:06.37	Padlock
11	Caiden Madzelan	2:17.11	Padlock
12	Lucas Reale	2:22.23	Padlock
13	Nick Hanson	3:02.26	Padlock
14	Alex Begolly	3:14.31	Padlock
15	John Uga	3:16.05	Padlock

Top 3 Women
Rank	Competitor	Time	Furthest Obstacle
1	Rachel Degutz	6:05.80	Tuning Forks
2	Casey Rothschild	3:39.29	Padlock
3	Cara Mack	4:29.60	Padlock

=== Night 3 ===
Another new obstacle was introduced, Drop Zone. Split Decision had two other obstacles: The Dungeon or Diving Boards.

Top 15 Competitors
Rank	Competitor	Time	Furthest Obstacle
1	Vance Walker	4:17.90	Finished
2	Josiah Pippel	5:26.21	Finished
3	Sean Bryan	5:57.15	Finished
4	Jonathan Godbout	6:15.12	Finished
5	Brett Sims	6:27.26	Finished
6	Adam Rayl	6:31.46	Finished
7	R.J. Roman	4:28.54	Diving Boards
8	Tyler Gillett	5:19.68	Diving Boards
9	Nate Pardo	5:24.17	Diving Boards
10	Kevin Carbone	2:05.60	Padlock
11	Tage Herrington	2:57.49	Padlock
12	Enzo DeFerrari Wilson	3:11.46	Padlock
13	Francisco Barajas	3:42.75	Padlock
14	DeShawn Harris	3:47.27	Padlock
15	Bob Reese	3:49.10	Padlock

Top 3 Women
Rank	Competitor	Time	Furthest Obstacle
1	Megan Rowe	5:00.66	Padlock
2	Meagan Martin	5:04.71	Padlock
3	Brittney Durant	1:36.71	Drop Zone

=== Night 4 ===
A record-breaking number of 12 athletes hit a semifinals buzzer tonight. Some notable competitors like Ethan Swanson, Joe Brown, Flip Rodriguez, Dan Polizzi, and Cal Phlohoros didn't move on to the National Finals. Jake Murray put the fastest time for the second year in a row in a semifinals round, despite a loss on the Power Tower against Austin Gray. Also, Jesse Labreck became the first woman competitor to clear the extended course.

Top 15 Competitors
Rank	Competitor	Time	Furthest Obstacle
1	Jake Murray	3:34.39	Finished
2	Austin Gray	3:50.92	Finished
3	Cam Baumgartner	4:12.43	Finished
4	Kyle Soderman	4:28.25	Finished
5	Kai Beckstrand	4:56.17	Finished
6	Hunter Guerard	5:06.99	Finished
7	Nate Hansen	5:13.20	Finished
8	Tyler Yamauchi	5:17.36	Finished
9	Matt Bradley	5:18.15	Finished
10	Eric Middleton	5:27.40	Finished
11	Mike Silenzi	6:15.99	Finished
12	Jesse Labreck	6:44.85	Finished
13	Devan Alexander	3:10.40	The Dungeon
14	Donovan Metoyer	3:27.65	Diving Boards
15	Jamie Rahn	3:46.43	Diving Boards

Top 3 Women
Rank	Competitor	Time	Furthest Obstacle
1	Jesse Labreck	6:44.85	Finished
2	Ava Colasanti	1:14.80	Drop Zone
3	Heather Weissinger	1:48.07	Drop Zone

=== Los Angeles Semifinals Leaderboard ===
Top 60 Competitors
Rank	Competitor	Time	Furthest Obstacle
1	Jake Murray	3:34.39	Finished
2	Austin Gray	3:50.92	Finished
3	Jay Lewis	3:54.05	Finished
4	Joe Moravsky	4:09.86	Finished
5	Cam Baumgartner	4:12.43	Finished
6	Kaden Lebsack	4:13.92	Finished
7	Vance Walker	4:17.90	Finished
8	Kyle Soderman	4:28.25	Finished
9	Daniel Gil	4:40.11	Finished
10	True Becker	4:44.29	Finished
11	Kai Beckstrand	4:56.17	Finished
12	Amir Malik	5:04.79	Finished
13	Hunter Guerard	5:06.99	Finished
14	Nate Hansen	5:13.20	Finished
15	Tyler Yamauchi	5:17.36	Finished
16	Matt Bradley	5:18.15	Finished
17	Josiah Pippel	5:26.21	Finished
18	Eric Middleton	5:27.40	Finished
19	Sean Bryan	5:57.15	Finished
20	Jonathan Godbout	6:15.12	Finished
21	Mike Silenzi	6:15.99	Finished
22	Brett Sims	6:27.26	Finished
23	Adam Rayl	6:31.46	Finished
24	Jesse Labreck	6:44.85	Finished
25	Brian Burkhardt	7:18.59	Finished
26	Max Feinberg	7:19.90	Finished
27	Abel Gonzalez	7:27.06	Finished
28	Devan Alexander	3:10.40	The Dungeon
29	Owen Dyer	3:26.97	Tuning Forks
30	Donovan Metoyer	3:27.65	Diving Boards
31	Jamie Rahn	3:46.43	Diving Boards
32	Deren Perez	3:55.74	Tuning Forks
33	Ryan Meeks	4:21.35	Inverter
34	Isaiah Thomas	4:21.70	Tuning Forks
35	Christian Youst	4:26.91	Inverter
36	Elijah Browning	4:27.19	Inverter
37	R.J. Roman	4:28.54	Diving Boards
38	Isaiah Wakeham	4:32.10	Inverter
39	Anthony Porter	4:51.54	Inverter
40	Lance Pekus	4:57.18	Inverter
41	Dan Champagne	5:11.40	Inverter
42	Tyler Gillett	5:19.68	Diving Boards
43	Nate Pardo	5:24.17	Diving Boards
44	Isabella Wakeham	5:47.35	Inverter
45	Tiana Webberley	5:52.01	Tuning Forks
46	Rachel Degutz	6:05.80	Tuning Forks
47	Jackson Twait	1:43.38	Padlock
48	Chris Behrends	2:03.17	Padlock
49	Kevin Carbone	2:05.60	Padlock
50	Brett Hernandez Strong	2:06.37	Padlock
51	Caiden Madzelan	2:17.11	Padlock
52	Lucas Reale	2:22.23	Padlock
53	Tage Herrington	2:57.49	Padlock
54	Nick Hanson	3:02.26	Padlock
55	Enzo DeFerrari Wilson	3:11.46	Padlock
56	Alex Begolly	3:14.31	Padlock
57	John Uga	3:16.05	Padlock
58	Francisco Barajas	3:42.75	Padlock
59	DeShawn Harris	3:47.27	Padlock
60	Bob Reese	3:49.10	Padlock

Top 12 Women
Rank	Competitor	Time	Furthest Obstacle
1	Jesse Labreck	6:44.85	Finished
2	Isabella Wakeham	5:47.35	Inverter
3	Tiana Webberley	5:52.01	Tuning Forks
4	Rachel Degutz	6:05.80	Tuning Forks
5	Casey Rothschild	3:39.29	Padlock
6	Cara Mack	4:29.60	Padlock
7	Megan Rowe	5:00.66	Padlock
8	Meagan Martin	5:04.71	Padlock
9	Ava Colasanti	1:14.80	Drop Zone
10	Brittney Durant	1:36.71	Drop Zone
11	Heather Weissinger	1:48.07	Drop Zone
12	Zhanique Lovett	0:28.72	Tilt-A-Whirl

== Las Vegas National Finals ==
Slide Surfer, Swinging Blades, and Dipping Birds were introduced. Split Decision was a choice between The High Road or Fly Hooks, the final Stage 1 obstacle. The contestant who won American Ninja Warrior or became Last Ninja Standing indicated in blue at the moment of securance. The contestants eliminated on that round indicated in red. The contestants who failed, but were allowed a second attempt by Safety Pass indicated in green. Female contestants who completed the course are indicated in pink.

=== Stage 1 ===
A total of 27 competitors finished Stage 1. Jesse Labreck, who fell three times in the last obstacle of Stage 1, got revenge and became the third woman ever to advance to Stage 2. Meanwhile, Jake Murray had the fastest time on Stage 1 for the third time. Joe Moravsky fell on The High Road on his first attempt, but thanks to the Safety Pass, he completed Stage 1 on his second try.

Rank	Competitor	Time	Furthest Obstacle
1	Jake Murray	1:30.62	Finished
2	Kyle Soderman	2:03.96	Finished
3	Isaiah Thomas	2:13.88	Finished
4	Kaden Lebsack	2:13.95	Finished
5	Joe Moravsky	2:14.76	Finished
6	Tyler Gillett	2:19.10	Finished
7	Josiah Pippel	2:19.26	Finished
8	Tyler Yamauchi	2:19.34	Finished
9	Sean Bryan	2:19.59	Finished
10	Matt Bradley	2:20.48	Finished
11	Austin Gray	2:20.72	Finished
12	Brian Burkhardt	2:23.12	Finished
13	Vance Walker	2:24.18	Finished
14	Jesse Labreck	2:24.98	Finished
15	Kai Beckstrand	2:27.29	Finished
16	Tage Herrington	2:29.19	Finished
17	Isaiah Wakeham	2:30.50	Finished
18	Donovan Metoyer	2:30.72	Finished
19	Mike Silenzi	2:30.97	Finished
20	Kevin Carbone	2:32.38	Finished
21	Max Feinberg	2:35.97	Finished
22	Elijah Browning	2:36.48	Finished
23	Jonathan Godbout	2:36.62	Finished
24	Ryan Meeks	2:36.94	Finished
25	Enzo DeFerrari Wilson	2:42.63	Finished
26	Anthony Porter	2:43.13	Finished
27	Adam Rayl	2:44.99	Finished
28	Brett Sims	2:45.00	Fly Hooks (3 of 3)
29	Christian Youst	2:45.00	Fly Hooks (3 of 3)
30	Jamie Rahn	2:16.64	Fly Hooks (2 of 3)
31	RJ Roman	2:43.67	Fly Hooks (2 of 3)
32	Hunter Gerard	2:45.00	Fly Hooks (1 of 3)
33	Nate Pardo	2:06.60	Dipping Birds
34	Isabella Wakeham	2:45.00	Dipping Birds
35	Lance Pekus	1:11.88	Tire Run (6 of 6)
36	Zhanique Lovett	1:25.36	Tire Run (3 of 6)
37	Dan Champagne	0:14.63	Jumping Spider
38	Cara Mack	0:17.60	Jumping Spider
39	Nate Hansen	0:50.52	Jumping Spider
40	Bob Reese	0:15.26	Double Dipper
41	Rachel Degutz	0:27.51	Double Dipper
42	Megan Rowe	0:45.51	Double Dipper
43	Brett Hernandez Strong	0:06.13	Swinging Blades
44	Cam Baumgartner	0:06.58	Swinging Blades
45	Heather Weissenger	0:06.59	Swinging Blades
46	Brittney Durant	0:08.51	Swinging Blades
47	Meagan Martin	0:03.10	Slide Surfer
48	DeShawn Harris	0:02.47	Slide Surfer

=== Stage 2 ===
Striding Steps, Double Salmon Ladder (after 8 years of absence), Hammer Drop, and Epic Air Surfer were introduced on Stage 2. Split Decision was not included past Stage 1.

Number	Competitor	Final result	Time
1	Kaden Lebsack	Clear	3:01.44
2	Austin Gray	Clear	3:14.57
3	Kyle Soderman	Clear	3:23.84
4	Vance Walker	Clear	3:24.72
5	Jake Murray	Falling Shelves	2:27.24
6	Sean Bryan	Falling Shelves	3:04.58
7	Adam Rayl	Falling Shelves	3:17.52
8	Josiah Pippel	Falling Shelves	3:18.84
9	Mike Silenzi	Falling Shelves	3:18.94
10	Elijah Browning	Falling Shelves	N/A
11	Isaiah Thomas	Epic Air Surfer	2:17.19
12	Ryan Meeks	Epic Air Surfer	2:24.27
13	Brian Burkhardt	Epic Air Surfer	2:28.67
14	Kevin Carbone	Epic Air Surfer	N/A
15	Tage Herrington	Epic Air Surfer	N/A
16	Jonathan Godbout	Hammer Drop	1:22.57
17	Tyler Yamauchi	Hammer Drop	1:26.43
18	Matt Bradley	Hammer Drop	1:28.90
19	Anthony Porter	Hammer Drop	N/A
20	Max Feinberg	Hammer Drop	N/A
21	Enzo DeFerrari Wilson	V Formation	0:59.32
22	Isaiah Wakeham	Double Salmon Ladder	0:07.32
23	Jesse Labreck	Double Salmon Ladder	0:11.00
24	Tyler Gillett	Double Salmon Ladder	N/A
25	Joe Moravsky	Striding Steps	0:04.02
26	Kai Beckstrand	Striding Steps	0:05.43
27	Donovan Metoyer	Striding Steps	N/A

=== Stage 3 ===
15-year old Kaden Lebsack became the first rookie ever to complete Stage 3, as well as the first teenager and the fifth competitor passed overall. At that time, he already secured a cash prize.

Number	Competitor	Time	Furthest obstacle
1	Kaden Lebsack	7:06.10	Clear
2	Austin Gray	4:00.91	Eyeglass Alley
3	Vance Walker	4:41.93	Eyeglass Alley
4	Kyle Soderman	2:03.61	Ultimate Cliffhanger

=== Stage 4 ===
Number	Competitor	Title	Result	Height
1	Kaden Lebsack	Last Ninja Standing	Time out	70 ft up.

== Ratings ==
Episode		Air Date	Timeslot (ET)	Rating (18–49)	Viewers (Millions)
1	Qualifiers #1	May 31, 2021	Monday 8:00 PM	0.5	3.30
2	Qualifiers #2	June 7, 2021	Monday 8:00 PM	0.5	3.17
3	Qualifiers #3	June 21, 2021	Monday 9:00 PM	0.5	2.93
4	Qualifiers #4	June 28, 2021	Monday 8:00 PM	0.5	3.25
5	Qualifiers #5	July 12, 2021	Monday 8:00 PM	0.5	3.32
6	Semifinals #1	July 19, 2021	Monday 8:00 PM	0.5	3.34
7	Semifinals #2	August 9, 2021	Monday 8:00 PM		3.45
8	Semifinals #3	August 16, 2021	Monday 8:00 PM	0.6	3.54
9	Semifinals #4	August 23, 2021	Monday 8:00 PM	0.4	3.20
10	National Finals #1	August 30, 2021	Monday 8:00 PM	0.5	3.66
11	National Finals #2	September 6, 2021	Monday 8:00 PM	0.5	3.19
12	National Finals #3	September 13, 2021	Monday 8:00 PM	0.5	3.53
