= List of Tokyo Broadcasting System announcers =

Below is a list of current and former broadcast announcers for the Tokyo Broadcasting System, its spin-offs, and predecessor entities.

== Current announcers ==
=== Male or man ===
- Naoki Uraguchi (浦口 直樹, Uraguchi Naoki) joined in 1983
- Masahiro Kiyohara (清原 正博, Kiyohara Masahiro) joined in 1988
- Masao Mukai (向井 政生, Mukai Masao) joined in 1988
- Yutaka Kobayashi (小林 豊, Kobayashi Yutaka) joined in 1989
- Tetsuya Saitō (斎藤 哲也, Saitō Tetsuya) joined in 1989
- Hiroki Andō (安東 弘樹, Andō Hiroki) joined in 1991
- Keisuke Hatsuta (初田 啓介, Hatsuta Keisuke) joined in 1993
- Naohiro Masuda (升田 尚宏, Masuda Naohiro) joined in 1994
- Toshiyuki Doi (土井 敏之, Doi Toshiyuki) joined in 1996
- Wataru Ogasawara (小笠原 亘, Ogasawara Wataru) joined in 1996
- Shinichirō Azumi (安住 紳一郎, Azumi Shinichirō) joined in 1997
- Ryūta Itō (伊藤 隆太, Itō Ryūta) joined in 1997
- Kengo Komada (駒田 健吾, Komada Kengo) joined in 1998
- Etsuo Arata (新タ 悦男, Arata Etsuo) joined in 1998
- Fumiyasu Satō (佐藤 文康, Satō Fumiyasu) joined in 1999
- Shōhei Fujimori (藤森 祥平, Fujimori Shōhei) joined in 2001
- Takahiro Takano (高野 貴裕, Takano Takahiro) joined in 2003
- Ayumi Akaogi (赤荻 歩, Akaogi Ayumi) joined in 2004
- Noriyuki Hasumi (蓮見孝之, Hasumi Noriyuki) joined in 2004
- Ryūsuke Itō (伊藤 隆佑, Itō Ryūsuke) joined in 2006
- Takahiro Inoue (井上 貴博, Inoue Takahiro) joined in 2007
- Shin'ya Sugiyama (杉山 真也, Sugiyama Shin'ya) joined in 2007
- Takaaki Yamamoto (山本 匠晃, Yamamoto Taaki) joined in 2008
- Tomohiro Ishii (石井 大裕, Ishii Tomohiro) joined in 2010
- Kazato Kumazaki (熊崎 風斗, Kumazaki Kazato) joined in 2013
- Tomohiro Kiire (喜入 友浩, Kiire Tomohiro) joined in 2017
- Hiroki Kobayashi (小林 廣輝, Kobayashi Hiroki) joined in 2018
- Shun Watanabe (渡部峻, Watanabe Shun) joined in 2019
- Shintaro Saito (齋藤慎太郎, Saito Shintaro) joined in 2020
- Masato Shinanba (南波雅俊, Shinanba Masato) joined in 2020
- Mitsuaki Ozawa (小沢 光葵, Ozawa Mitsuaki) joined in 2021
- Mitsuki Takayanagi (高柳 光希, Takayanagi Mitsuki) joined in 2021
- Ukyo Furuta (古田 敬郷, Furuta Ukyo) joined in 2022
- Nagao Tsubasa (長尾翼, Tsubasa Nagao) joined in 2025

=== Female or woman ===
- Yuki Nagamine (長峰 由紀, Nagamine Yuki) joined in 1987
- Junko Akisawa (秋沢 淳子, Akisawa Junko) joined in 1991
- Kyoko Nagaoka (長岡 杏子, Nagaoka Kyōko) joined in 1994
- Tomoko Ogawa (小川 知子, Ogawa Tomoko) joined in 1995
- Mika Horii (堀井 美香, Horii Mika) joined in 1995
- Hiroko Ogura (小倉 弘子, Ogura Hiroko) joined in 1997
- Eri Toyama (外山 惠理, Toyama Eri) joined in 1998
- Ayano Toyoda (豊田 綾乃, Toyoda Ayano) joined in
- Tomoko Kubota (久保田 智子, Kubota Tomoko) joined in 2000
- Ayu Yamanouchi (山内 あゆ, Yamanouchi Ayu) joined in 2000
- Yuriko Takahata (高畑 百合子, Takahata Yuriko) joined in 2003
- Hitomi Okamura (岡村 仁美, Okamura Hitomi) joined in 2005
- Mai Demizu (出水 麻衣, Demizu Mai) joined in 2006
- Mayumi Mizuno (水野 真裕美, Mizuno Mayumi) joined in 2006
- Sylwia Katō (加藤 シルビア, Katō Sirubia) joined in 2008
- Ai Etō (江藤 愛, Etō Ai) joined in 2009
- Yūmi Furuya (古谷 有美, Furuya Yūmi) joined in 2011
- Yumiko Kobayashi (小林 由未子, Kobayashi Yumiko) joined in 2013
- Reina Minagawa (皆川 玲奈, Minagawa Reina) joined in 2014
- Saeko Kamimura (上村 彩子, Kamimura Saeko) joined in 2015
- Erika Yamamoto (山本 恵里伽, Yamamoto Erika) joined in 2016
- Maoko Hibi (日比 麻音子, Hibi Maoko) joined in 2016
- Junna Yamagata (山形 純菜, Yamagata Junna) joined in 2017
- Rina Yamamoto (山本 里菜, Yamamoto Rina) joined in 2017
- Megu Ugajin (宇賀神 メグ, Ugajin Megu) joined in 2018
- Mako Tamura (田村 真子, Tamura Mako) joined in 2018
- Ami Yoshihara (良原 安美, Yoshihara Ami) joined in 2018
- Natsuko Kondo (近藤 夏子, Kondo Natsuko) joined in 2019
- Rina Shinohara (篠原 梨菜, Shinohara Rina) joined in 2019
- Yuko Wakabayashi (若林 有子, Wakabayashi Yuko) joined in 2019
- Sayako Nomura (野村 彩也子, Nomura Sayako) joined in 2020
- Maine Sasaki (佐々木 舞音, Sasaki Maine) joined in 2021
- Eriko Yoshimura (吉村 恵里子, Yoshimura Eriko) joined in 2022
- Kyoko Nango (南後 杏子, Nango Kyoko) joined in 2023
- Nana Mitarai (御手洗 菜々, Mitarai Nana) joined in 2023
- Kyla Urano (浦野芽良, Urano Kyla) joined in 2024
- Narumi Tada (多田成美, Tada Narumi) joined in 2026
- Ema Burns (バーンズ恵麻, Banzu Ema) joined in 2026
- Fujioka Hajime (藤岡源, Hajime Fujioka) joined in 2026

== Former announcers ==
=== Retired announcers ===
==== Male ====
- Takayuki Akutagawa (芥川隆行, Akutagawa Takayuki) (1951-1959); now as a narrator, he is in charge of "National Theater" (Mito Komon, Ooka Echizen, etc.). He died in October 1990
- Masaaki Yamabayashi (山林正明, Yamabayashi Masaaki) (1954-1986)
- Kunio Tabata (田畑国夫, Tabata Kunio) (1955-1985)
- Tomohide Masuko (増子智英, Masuko Tomohide) (1955-1992)
- Michio Matsuno (松野道男, Matsuno Michio) (1955-1983)
- Hiroshi Kume (久米 宏, Kume Hiroshi) (1967–1979); now as freelance announcer
- Shuji Yamada (山田修爾, Yamada Shuji) (1969-2005); now as Director, Producer, transferred to the entertainment office "CMA (→ Cast Plus)" He also served as managing director, President and Representative Director, and Advisor to Directors. He died in 2013.
- Kunihiro Tsujimura (辻村国弘, Tsujimura Kunihiro) (1972-2006) now as Former NHK announcerlater director of "JNN News Feature", desk of "NEWS23", producer of "World Heritage"
- Hisato Nakamura (中村久人, Nakamura Hisato) (1981–2017); now as TBS Radio News Desk
- Shuichi Shibata (柴田修一, Shibata Shuichi) (1981-2017); now as TBS Radio's news desk and full-time faculty member of the Department of Newspapers, Faculty of Law, Nihon University
- Makito Sugiyama (杉山 真喜人, Sugiyama Makito) (1988 - 1991); now as Content Business in Bureau
- Daisuke Shimizu (清水大輔, Shimizu Daisuke) (1993-2022); now as General Affairs Bureau and Personnel and Labor Relations Bureau
- Hiroshi Shiga (志賀 大士, Shiga Hiroshi) (1996-2005); now as Production Department Variety Production Department. Currently "COUNT DOWN TV" producer etc.
- Hasen Kuniyama (国山ハセン, Kuniyama Hasen) (2013 - 2022); now as Pivot video producer
- Ryuta Shinada (品田 亮太, Shinada Ryuta) (2014-2019); now as News Department
- Takahiro Tosaki (戸崎 貴広, Tosaki Takahiro) (1986–2021); now as freelance announcer

==== Female ====
- Noriko Sato (佐藤紀子, Satō Noriko) (1962-1966)
- Mieko Kenjo (見城美枝子, Kenjo Mieko) (1968-1973); now as Free announcer, essayist, journalist, vice president of Aomori University, professor of the Faculty of Sociology.
- Makiko Sugawara (菅原牧子, Sugawara Makiko) (1968-2003)
- Masako Noguchi (野口雅子, Noguchi Masako) (1983-1990)
- Toko Amemiya (雨宮 塔子, Amemiya Tōko) (1993–1999); now as freelance announcer
- Masako Shindo (進藤 晶子, Shindō Masako) (1994–2001)
- Keiko Kojima (小島 慶子, Kojima Keiko) (1995–2010); now as tarento and radio personality
- Ikumi Kimura (木村 郁美, Kimura Ikumi) (1996 -2018); now as Secretary's Office
- Chisato Kaiho (海保 知里, Kaiho Chisato) (1999–2008); now as freelance announcer
- Kanae Takeuchi (竹内 香苗, Takeuchi Kanae) (2001–2012); now lives in Argentina
- Ako Kawada (川田 亜子, Kawada Ako) (2002–2007); died in 2008
- Airi Yamada (山田 愛里, Yamada Airi) (2002–2012); now as UNHCR staff
- Maya Kobayashi (小林 麻耶, Kobayashi Maya) (2003–2009); now as freelance announcer
- Yūko Aoki (青木 裕子, Aoki Yūko) (2005–2012); now as freelance announcer
- Maki Arai (新井 麻希, Arai Maki) (2005–2010); now as freelance announcer
- Erina Masuda (枡田 絵理奈, Masuda Erina) (2008–2015); now as freelance announcer
- Minami Tanaka (田中みな実, Tanaka Minami) (2009–2014); now as freelance announcer
- Haruka Kobayashi (小林 悠, Kobayashi Haruka) (2010–2016)
- Nagisa Satō (佐藤 渚, Satō Nagisa) (2009–2017); now as a professional soccer player from Urawa Reds.
- Akiyo Yoshida (吉田 明世, Yoshida Akiyo) (2011-2019) now as Freelance announcer and radio personality affiliated with Amuse.
- Minaho Hayashi (林みなほ, Hayashi Minaho) (2012-2019)
- Yuri Sasagawa (笹川 友里, Sasagawa Yuri) (2011-2019) now as a former fencing player.
- Misato Ugaki (宇垣 美里, Ugaki Misato) (2014-2019)
- Kaede Itō (伊東 楓, Itō Kaede) (2016-2021) now as a picture book author and painter in Berlin
- Risa Unai (宇内 梨沙, Unai Risa) (2015-2025) now as member of the eSports Research Institute in the Live Entertainment Division and the New IP Development Department. After retiring, she plans to work as an individual game commentator without belonging to any agency.
