= Kintalo =

Japanese comedian and impressionist

- キンタロー。
- Born: Shiho Tanaka; 24 October 1981 (age 45); Okazaki, Aichi
- Education: Kansai Gaidai College; Shochiku Geino Tarento School
- Years active: 2011 - 2023
- Agent: Shochiku Geino
- Style: Gag; conte; monomane
- Height: 1.525 m (5 ft 0 in)
- Website: Official profile

Kintalo (キンタロー。, Kintarō.; born 24 October 1981, in Okazaki, Aichi) is a Japanese comedian and impressionist (monomane tarento). Her real name is Shiho Tanaka (田中 志保, Tanaka Shiho).

Kintalo is represented with Shochiku Geino. She is left-handed.

Kintalo's catchphrase is Iiko, Tsuyoi Ko, Kawaii Ko (良い子、強い子、可愛い子).

== Impressions ==
- Ayaka Nishiwaki (Perfume)
- Ami Nakashima (Dream and E-girls)
- Namie Amuro
- Shizuka Arakawa
- Angelina Jolie
- Antonio Inoki
- Rina Ikoma (Nogizaka46)
- Satomi Ishihara
- Tomomi Itano (AKB48)
- Midori Ito
- Yōsui Inoue
- Aya Ueto
- Yuko Oshima (AKB48)
- Yoko Ono
- Rie Kitahara (NGT48)
- Ayame Goriki
- Haruna Kojima (AKB48)
- Miina Tominaga (as Katsuo Isono in Sazae-san)
- Etsuko Kozakura (as Jibanyan in Yo-kai Watch)
- Haruka Shimazaki (AKB48)
- Aya Sugimoto
- Nana Suzuki
- Serina
- Minami Takahashi (AKB48)
- Emi Takei
- Mitsu Dan
- Taylor Swift
- Dewi Sukarno
- Yoshimi Tendo
- Sumiko Shirakawa (as Hiroshi Nakajima in Sazae-san)
- Kana Nishino
- Kanna Hashimoto (Rev. from DVL)
- Yū Hayami
- Kim Hyo-yeon (Girls' Generation)
- Atsuko Maeda (AKB48)
- Madonna
- Minako Inoue (MAX)
- Hibari Misora
- Momoiro Clover Z
  - Kanako Momota
  - Ayaka Sasaki
  - Momoka Ariyasu
- Lady Gaga
- Mayu Watanabe (AKB48)

== Filmography ==
=== TV series ===
Current

| Year | Title | Network | Notes |
|---|---|---|---|
| 2013 | Go Go! Smile! | CBC | Monday, later Thursday regular |
| 2014 | Smile! Kintalo | JRT | |

Former appearances

| Year | Title | Network | Notes |
|---|---|---|---|
| 2011 | Monomane Grand Prix | NTV | |
| 2012 | Go Jiman Live: Oshiage Now | Tokyo MX | |
| 2012 | Kanjani8 no Janiben | KTV | |
| 2012 | Maki Mizuno no Mahō no Restaurant | MBS | |
| 2012 | Namaiki! Arabikidan | TBS | |
| 2012 | Tonneruzu no Minasan no Okage deshita | Fuji TV | |
| 2012 | Mabatakī | Fuji TV | |
| 2013 | Bakushō Red Carpet | Fuji TV | Slogan is "Fudō no Center: Carpet Tōjō" |
| 2013 | Shinshun! Geinin Broker: Tōzai Anyaku Star Yume no Kyōen 2013 | KTV | |
| 2013 | Shibuya Deep A | NHK-G | |
| 2013 | Gyōretsu no dekiru Hōritsusōdansho | NTV | |
| 2013 | Kayō Kyoku! | TBS | First time with AKB48 member |
| 2013 | Hi 10 Engei Parade | MBS | |
| 2013 | Downtown no Gaki no Tsukai ya Arahende!! | NTV | |
| 2013 | Takajin Mune-ippai | KTV | |
| 2013 | Ariyoshi-kun no Shōjiki sanpo | Fuji TV | |
| 2013 | Moshimo no Simulation Variety: Otameshika'! | TV Asahi | |
| 2013 | Mezanyu | Fuji TV | |
| 2013 | Lion no gokigenyō | Fuji TV | |
| 2013 | R-1 guran puri | Fuji TV | |
| 2013 | Masahiro Nakai no Ayashī Uwasa no Atsumaru Toshokan | TV Asahi | |
| 2013 | Onegai! Ranking | TV Asahi | |
| 2013 | Masahiro Nakai no Kinyōbi no SMA-tachi e | TBS | |
| 2013 | Mecha-Mecha Iketeru! | Fuji TV | |
| 2013 | Hoko×tate | Fuji TV | |
| 2013 | Quiz Present Variety: Q-sama!! | TV Asahi | |
| 2013 | Shabekuri 007 | NTV | |
| 2013 | Somosan Seppa! | Fuji TV | |
| 2013 | Peke×Pon | Fuji TV | |
| 2013 | Akko ni omakase! | TBS | |
| 2013 | Nogizakatte, doko? | TVA | |
| 2013 | Guruguru Ninety Nine | NTV | |
| 2013 | Honoo-no Taiiku-kai TV | TBS | |
| 2013 | Sanma no Super karakuri TV | TBS | |
| 2013 | Hirunandesu! | NTV | |
| 2013 | Banana Juku | THK | |
| 2013 | O sekkyō Idol: Shikaru Genji | ABC | |
| 2013 | Chakushin Orei! Kētai Ōgiri | NHK-G | |
| 2013 | Torihada (Hi) Scoop Eizō 100-ka Jiten | TV Asahi | |
| 2013 | Calcolon | Fuji TV | |
| 2013 | Himitsu no Kenmin Show | YTV | |
| 2013 | Sanma & Cream no Geinō-kai (Hi) Kojin Jōhō Grand Prix | Fuji TV | |
| 2013 | All-Star Thanksgiving | TBS | |
| 2013 | Shiawase no Kiiroi Koinu | CTV | |
| 2013 | Tsūkai! Akashiya Denshidai | MBS | |
| 2013 | Cream Quiz: Miracle 9 | TV Asahi | |
| 2013 | Taka-Toshi & Onsui ga Iku Chīsana Tabi Series | Fuji TV | |
| 2013 | Tsutaete Pikacchi | NHK-G | |
| 2013 | PS Sansei | CTV | |
| 2013 | Bakushō sokkuri monomane Kōhaku Uta Gassen Special | Fuji TV | |
| 2013 | Chō Sennyū! Real Scoop Hyper | Fuji TV | |
| 2013 | run for money Tōsō-chū | Fuji TV | |
| 2013 | Ikinari! Kogane Densetsu. | TV Asahi | |
| 2013 | TV Shakai Jikken: Asunaro Lab | Fuji TV | |
| 2013 | Sunday Japon | TBS | |
| 2013 | VS Arashi | Fuji TV | |
| 2013 | Waratte Iitomo! | Fuji TV | |
| 2013 | Tenma-san ga yuku | TBS | As Atsuko Maeda's look-alike |
| 2013 | Monomane Ōzakettei-sen | Fuji TV | |
| 2015 | Uta ga umai Ōzakettei-sen Special | Fuji TV | |
| 2015 | Rhythm Neta A Go Go | TBS | |
| 2016 | Knight Scoop | ABC | Appeared in "Ojīchan no Last Dance" |
| 2016 | Oha Suta | TV Tokyo | Appeared in Hanamaru Gundan |
| 2016 | Shikujiri Sensei: Ore mitai ni naru na!! | TV Asahi | |
| 2016 | Yonimo Kimyōna Monogatari '16 Haru no Tokubetsu-hen: Bijin Zei | Fuji TV | As Kin-chan |

=== Radio ===
| Year | Title | Network | Notes |
|---|---|---|---|
| 2013 | Golden Bomber no Sho Kiryuin no All Night Nippon | NBS | |
| 2013 | Bakushō Mondai Cowboy | TBS Radio | |
| 2013 | Nissan a, Reiji Abe: Beyond The Average | Tokyo FM | As Kintalo-ko Maeda |
| 2014 | Bay Line Go! Go! | Bay FM | Wednesday DJ |
| 2015 | Konya mo Kai Shingeki | Bay FM | |

=== Stage ===
| Year | Title | Role | Notes | Ref. |
|---|---|---|---|---|
| 2016 | Kohei Tsuka Nana-kai-ki Tsuitō Tokubetsu Kōen: Ring Ring Ring 2016 | Chigusa Nagayo | Lead role | |
| 2016 | SBK48: Hataage Kōen | | | |
| 2016 | SBK48: Hataage Tsuika Kōen | | | |
| 2016 | SBK48: Hataage Osaka Kōen | | | |
| 2016 | The Adventures of Priscilla, Queen of the Desert | Cynthia | Dual cast | |

=== Music videos ===
| Year | Title |
|---|---|
| 2013 | Juliet "Sotsu Renka" |

=== TV drama ===
| Year | Title | Role | Network | Notes | Ref. |
|---|---|---|---|---|---|
| 2016 | Cock Keibu no Bansan-kai | Mari Oda | TBS | Episode 3 | |

=== Anime television ===
| Title | Role | Network | Ref. |
|---|---|---|---|
| Aware! Meisaku-kun | Shiro zukin, Yō, kirishita | NHK-E | |
| Kayoe! Chū-gaku | Oshima, girl, boy that ran over by Wada | THK | |
| Nandaka Velonica | Velonica | NHK-E | |
| Hugtto! PreCure | Rita Yoshimi | ANN | |

=== Anime films ===
| Year | Title | Role | Ref. |
|---|---|---|---|
| 2016 | Colorful Ninja iro Maki | Maki Murasaki | |

=== Events ===
| Year | Title | Ref. |
|---|---|---|
| 2013 | Looper public commemoration | |
| 2013 | Fire with Fire public commemoration | |
| 2013 | 16th Tokyo Girls Collection 2013 Spring/Summer | |
| 2013 | Lion Corporation "Seikanzai Deodorant Ban Series" new advert recital | |
| 2013 | Nissin Foods "Cup Noodle goban" new advert recital | |

=== Magazines ===
| Year | Title | Ref. |
|---|---|---|
| 2012 | Josei Jishin | |
| 2013 | Spa! | |
| 2013 | An an | |
| 2013 | Nikkei Entertainment! | |
| 2013 | Non-no | |
| 2013 | JJ | |
| 2013 | Vivi | |

=== Advertisements ===
| Year | Title |
|---|---|
| 2013 | Suntory Foods Boss Rainbow Mountain Blend "Convini" |
