= Ugaki =

Ugaki (Japanese: 宇垣) is a Japanese surname. Notable people with the surname include:

- Hidenari Ugaki (宇垣 秀成, 1963), Japanese voice actor
- Kazushige Ugaki (宇垣 一成, 1868–1956), Japanese general
- Matome Ugaki (宇垣 纏, 1890–1945), Japanese admiral and poet
- Misato Ugaki (宇垣 美里, born 1991), Japanese announcer

== See also ==
- Bounts in Bleach series for a character in the anime series Bleach
