= All-Star Thanksgiving =

Japanese television series

- Genre: Game show, variety show, Television special
- Based on: Everybody's Equal
- Directed by: Takayuki Kyuno (52nd – current, stage director)
- Presented by: Shinsuke Shimada (1st–40th); Koji Imada (41st–current); Wakako Shimazaki (1st–current)
- Country of origin: Japan
- Original language: Japanese
- No. of episodes: 69 + 3 specials

Production
- Production location: TBS Headquarters
- Running time: 2h 48 m (seasons 1-2, year-end special); 4h 48m (season 3); 5h 18m (seasons 4-66, 68-69); 6h 8m (season 67); 6h 45m (sports special 1); 7h 15m (sports special 1); 2h (Afterparty seasons 1-13)
- Production company: TBS

Original release
- Network: JNN (TBS)
- Release: October 5, 1991 – present

All-Star Thanksgiving Festival (Japanese: オールスター感謝祭), commonly referred to as All-Star Thanksgiving, is a Japanese television panel game and special program which has aired twice a year in April and October on TBS since October 1991.

A program unveiling the cast of the new show on TBS-TV.

== History and format ==
=== 1989: Everybody's Equal ===
See Everybody's Equal - Format

All-Star Thanksgiving began as a licensed adaptation of the 1989 British television format Everybody's Equal.

In the original format, the entire cast of 200 competitors is asked a four-option multiple choice question with a 10-second time-limit, and all competitors who submit an incorrect answer are eliminated from the game. This continues for a predetermined number of questions, although the contestants are never informed of how many this will be, and it changes between each episode. When the final question is read, a bell will ring, and the best overall remaining competitor is announced and wins a prize. If multiple people get the final question correct, the contestant who responded the fastest is awarded this title. All competitors must then complete a single, more difficult question called a "Bonus Quiz" that requires the four options to be ordered in the correct configuration. If the winner of the main game is correct, they will win a secondary prize. If they are incorrect, this prize is split among any of the 199 other competitors who got it correct.

=== 1991: Quiz! Hit 25% and Format Adjustments ===
A pilot episode launched on June 28, 1991, under the title Quiz! 25% Hit. Unlike the predecessor, each episode is broken into several Periods. Each period operates as an individual match of Everybody's Equal, narrowing down the group to a single winner. In addition, a new rule is added that on top of any competitors who got the question incorrect, the slowest competitor to get the correct answer would also be eliminated as an incentive to answer quickly. After the Bonus Quiz, a new period begins and all 200 competitors re-enter the competition as a separate game. Additionally, the 200 competitors are broken into eight teams of 25, each with a designated celebrity captain. After all Periods have been completed, an additional prize is awarded to the winning overall team based on the combined score of every period.

Following the initial pilot, a run of 23 weekly episodes aired between October 17, 1991, and March 26, 1992, before being cancelled due to low ratings

=== 1991–1992: All-Star Thanksgiving ===
Shortly after the pilot of Quiz! Hit 25%, TBS envisioned an all-celebrity version of the program. Prior to this point, TBS had been broadcasting a large-scale celebrity programs since 1975. This began with 20 Years Gathering! in 1975, a sketch comedy program broadcast to celebrate 20 years of TBS Broadcasting. Following its positive reception, the program was renewed into a twice per year set of specials called April Gathering! and October Gathering!. In order to add further variety to the program, the cast of celebrities would also occasionally participate in small reproduction of other quiz shows being broadcast on TBS, namely Quiz Derby, Perfect Can Can and The Chance (The Price Is Right). In 1985, the series was renewed into The TV Showcase, expanding the lineup of quiz crossovers to around 10 per season. In 1987, it was renewed again into The Quiz Showcase, which removed all of the remaining non-quiz elements.

Following the success of Quiz! Hit 25% and the dwindling ratings of The Quiz Showcase, the decided to create All-Star Thanksgiving Festival, a version of Quiz! Hit 25% that featured exclusively popular celebrities. The teams were each themed after different people in the television industry, with the initial teams being: JNN Announcers, Infotainment, Sports, Drama, Music, Quiz, News and TBS Announcers. Unlike most other television programs, All-Star Thanksgiving would not be pre-recorded, and would instead broadcast as a live event. The show was an immediate, massive success.

=== 1992–1995: Shift to contemporary format ===
After two successful seasons, the third season of All-Star Thanksgiving saw some major format changes. The broadcast runtime was massively expanded from 2 hours to 5 1/2 hours, allowing the number of periods to be expanded from 3–4 up to 10-20 per episode. The entire team component was scrapped and the competition became fully individual again, more closely resembling Everybody's Equal. Leaning into the theme of Thanksgiving, partway through the broadcast there would be an intermission where competitors gather and eat dinner, allowing a break for both competitors and viewers. During this time, an extended block of advertisements for current and upcoming TBS programs would air, while showing the competitors mingling.

In 1993, a side series called TV Cram School launched that featured four pairs of one celebrity and one "genius" elementary school student completing significantly harder advanced mathematics questions with a 60-second time limit. The series ran for 20 episodes before being cancelled, due to its timeslot being in direct competition with the far more popular Dragon Ball Z.

1993 saw another prominent change to the show with the introduction of the Mini Marathon. Between periods, a group of competitors were selected to compete in one of two short 2.5 km marathon around the studio. The remaining competitors would then participate in Sports betting on these competitors, with a cash prize split among all competitors who predicted the winner correctly, as well as a small allocation of points.

The 7th season, airing in the Fall of 1994, greatly expanded upon this concept by adding Sprinting and Swimming races into the lineup, as well as a Dead hang competition, and a Sumo Wrestling bracket that all featured the same sports betting. Following this season, the number of competitors invited to each mini marathon began to slowly increase, and a Handicap system was put in place to give slower competitors a head start, such that the race to the finish line would be much closer and more unpredictable.

=== 1995–2019: Divergence from original format ===
Over the following 15 years, the focus on the marathon and the between period events would expand significantly. The sports and racing events would be expanded to including events such as Horse racing, Kart racing, Chariot racing. Other sports events would be brought in such as Archery, and non-sports events such as comedy competitions, and climbing slippery stairs would appear. As this occurred the number of periods was reduced to make room. In addition, over time alternates to the 4-question multiple choice were added, such as 2-of-6 and yes or no questions.

As technology advanced, during the late 1999's TBS began allowing viewers to play along from home using their Cell phone or using the Datacasting functionality built into Japanese televisions as a standard feature. Whichever viewers scored the best would win their own prize.

After the 40th season, long-time host Shinsuke Shimada was ousted from the television industry due to connections to the Yakuza, with popular comedian Koji Imada taking over a few seasons later.

In order to capitalize on the ongoing success of All-Star Thanksgiving, TBS decided to launch a late-night after-show that would feature an edgier cast and broadcast an hour after All-Star Thanksgiving ended. The first attempt to do this was 2014's Midnight Kanshasai, which feature exclusively betting on a series of races with 8 competitors each. Midnight Kanshasai did not see much success, however TBS was committed to the idea of a spinoff and tried again with 2016's All Celebrity Carnival, a show where teams of four competed in events that combined quizzes with racing and comedy. All Celebrity Carnival was a massive failure, and was even reported to Japan's Broadcasting Ethics & Program Improvement Organization over Partial nudity.

TBS's 3rd attempt was a program called All Star Afterparty. Instead of trying to make something brand new, Afterparty featured a format closer to the 1990s season of All-Star Thanksgiving than the main show had, as a response to complaints that Thanksgiving was beginning to deviate too much in formula. In addition, the show introduced heavy stakes where the last place competitor would be permanently banned from competing on the series again. All Star Afterparty ended up being highly successful, and has continued to this date.

=== 2020–present: Aftermath of the COVID-19 pandemic ===
As a result of the outbreak of the COVID-19 pandemic, the spring 2020 season of All-Star Thanksgiving and All Star Afterparty were both cancelled one week prior to broadcast. All-Star Thanksgiving would return in Fall 2020, with significant changes. The total cast list was dropped down to about 50, with half of them in studio and half remote to maintain Social distancing. All Star Afterparty would similarly return in Spring 2021 with a cast of only 32 in the studio. As restrictions have lifted, the competitor lineups have grown over time, however have stabilized at around 86 competitors, less than half of the pre-pandemic size.

Additionally, the post-pandemic seasons fully changed the format of the show, now allowing all competitors to attempt all questions, completely removing the elimination aspect of the show. Unlike the main show, All Star Afterparty would retain the prior elimination rules.

In 2024, TBS would begin broadcasting a third tournament under the title All Star Sports Festival. In this version, all competitors are well-known athletes, and the events take a heavier lean into athletics and nostalgia, featuring direct crossovers with Sasuke / Ninja Warrior, Sportsman No.1, Unbeatable Banzuke, and Tokyo Friend Park, while retaining the iconic mini marathon.

== Rules ==
Each episode of All-Star Thanksgiving is broken up into "Periods". Within each period, competitors are asked to answer multiple-choice questions. After each question, all incorrect respondents as well as the slowest correct respondent are eliminated. Play continues until either only a single competitor remains, or until a set number of questions has passed. The fastest remaining competitor is then given a "Bonus Quiz" for an additional prize, which is split among the other competitors if they are incorrect. In the case of a technical error, or all competitors being prematurely eliminated, the period will reset and all competitors will return.

Between some periods, events will occur. During these events, some competitors are chosen to compete, while all others will vote on the competitor or team they believe will win. Voters will split a cash prize for correct guesses, while competitors will receive a cash prize for winning.

Over the course of an entire episode, an ongoing score is calculated. This is typically 1 point per correct answer, 2 points per correct event guess, while event competitors may receive between 1 and 10 points based on their success within the event. During the episode, prizes from sponsors (typically high end cooking ingredients) are awarded for competitors in 50th, 100th and 150th place at set checkpoints. At the end of the episode, the competitors with the highest overall score win large cash prizes. In the event of a tie, the competitor with the lowest total response time will win. As a result, competitors will often try to answer questions very quickly by attempting to predict the answer, or immediately guessing if they are unsure. In All Star Afterparty, the lowest ranked player at the end of the episode will be permanently banned from competing again.

== Seasons summary ==
=== Main seasons ===
Broadcast Information			Quiz Results		Akasaka Mini Marathon Results	
No.	Year	Season	Winner	Score (pts)	Winner	Distance (meters)
1	1991	Autumn	News and Culture Team (25 people)	450	Not held	
1	1991	Autumn	Mai Yamane (Individual)	22	Not held	
2	1992	Spring	TBS Announcer Team (25 people)	469	Not held	
2	1992	Spring	Ken Ishiguro	—	Not held	
3	1992	Autumn	Keiko Saito	33	Not held	
4	1993	Spring	Keiko Nakajima	47	Kenichi Monma (Manager's Race)	2500m
4	1993	Spring	Keiko Nakajima	47	Akemi Masuda (Talent Race)	2500m
5	1993	Autumn	Kuniko Asagi	36	Yumiko Hayashi (Manager's Race)	2500m
5	1993	Autumn	Kuniko Asagi	36	Asami Masuda (Talent Race)	2500m
6	1994	Spring	Tsutomu Sekine	41	Junichi Ishida (1st Race)	3200m
6	1994	Spring	Tsutomu Sekine	41	Katsuo Tokashiki (2nd Race)	3200m
7	1994	Autumn	Sonomanma Higashi	47	Makoto Nonomura (1st Race)	2887m
7	1994	Autumn	Sonomanma Higashi	47	Minomonta (2nd Race)	1443m
8	1995	Spring	Yonesuke	35	Makoto Nonomura (1st Race)	2876m
8	1995	Spring	Yonesuke	35	Junichi Ishida (2nd Race)	2876m
9	1995	Autumn	Aki Mukai	44	Makoto Nonomura (1st Race)	2876m
9	1995	Autumn	Aki Mukai	44	Katsuo Tokashiki (2nd Race)	1438m
10	1996	Spring	Takuro Tatsumi	63	Mudou Oda	2070m
11	1996	Autumn	Yōko Nogiwa	50	Mudou Oda	2406m
12	1997	Spring	Sonomanma Higashi	829,230	Sonomanma Higashi	3498m
12	1997	Spring	Sonomanma Higashi	829,230	(Russia) Valentina Yegorova	3498m
13	1997	Autumn	Mikihisa Azama	1,040,000	Sonomanma Higashi (Men)	3455m
13	1997	Autumn	Mikihisa Azama	1,040,000	Riho Hashimoto (Women)	2303m
Special	1997	Year-end	Sonomanma Higashi	54	Not held	
14	1998	Spring	Masakazu Mimura (Summers)	47	Masayuki Izumikawa	2303m
15	1998	Autumn	Hirohide Yakumaru	43	Not held	
16	1999	Spring	Akira Hara	46	Kanpei Hazama	2303m
17	1999	Autumn	Kenta Aoshima	59	Masayuki Suzuki	3434m
18	2000	Spring	Miho Shiraishi	27	Meisui Kinoshita (Jovi Jova)	3434m
19	2000	Autumn	Takashi Matsuo	38	(Romania) Lidia Șimon	3434m
20	2001	Spring	Emiri Henmi	47	Satoshi Iida	3434m
21	2001	Autumn	Hirofumi Suga (Rozan)	52	Mari Tanigawa	3434m
22	2002	Spring	Hiromi Iwazaki	68	(Romania) Lidia Șimon	3434m
23	2002	Autumn	Yoshiko Nakada	61	Akihiro Nishino (King Kong)	3434m
24	2003	Spring	Kiriko Isono	47	Takeshi Mizuuchi	3434m
25	2003	Autumn	LaSalle Ishii	57	Kenji Moriwaki	3434m
26	2004	Spring	Jun Hasegawa	53	Akihiro Nishino (King Kong)	3468m
27	2004	Autumn	Masayuki Watanabe	53	Akihiro Nishino (King Kong)	3468m
28	2005	Spring	Mari Tanigawa	54	(Brazil) Vanderlei de Lima	3468m
29	2005	Autumn	Kumiko Okae	42	(Brazil) Vanderlei de Lima	3769.2m
30	2006	Spring	Masato Yamada	50	(Kenya) Erick Wainaina	3948m
31	2006	Autumn	Yuko Mizuno	49	Yusuke Yamamoto	4068m
32	2007	Spring	Tooru Hotoharu (Ameagari Kesshitai)	53	(Kenya) Erick Wainaina	3190m
33	2007	Autumn	Junichi Ishida	42	Antonio Koinoki	3700m
34	2008	Spring	Hiroshi Shinagawa (Shinagawa Shoji)	45	Neko Hiroshi	3190m
35	2008	Autumn	Satoko Urata	43	(Kenya) Erick Wainaina	3850m
36	2009	Spring	Motohiro Takewaka (Buffalo Goro)	38	(Kenya) Erick Wainaina	3400m
37	2009	Autumn	Shintaro Yamada	38	Yuya Yamamoto	2550m
38	2010	Spring	Ken Maeda	29	Tomoya Warabino	2550m
39	2010	Autumn	Kumiko Okae	32	(Kenya) Erick Wainaina	3400m
40	2011	Spring	Kunikazu Katsumata	39	Neko Hiroshi	3400m
41	2011	Autumn	Emiri Nakayama	32	Neko Hiroshi	3400m
42	2012	Spring	Guadalcanal Taka	19	Kin'nikun Nakayama	3400m
43	2012	Autumn	Takeshi Mizuuchi	42	(Kenya) Erick Wainaina	3400m
44	2013	Spring	Kentarō Kokado (Lotti)	28	Wataru Mori	3400m
45	2013	Autumn	Honoo-no Taiiku-kai TV Team (4 people)	178	Neko Hiroshi	3600m
45	2013	Autumn	Keisuke Okada (Individual)	53	Neko Hiroshi	3600m
46	2014	Spring	Masato Wada	19	(Kenya) Bedan Karoki Muchiri	3600m
47	2014	Autumn	Nagiko Tōno	25	Kentaro Uno	3400m
48	2015	Spring	Takushi Tanaka (Ungirls)	22	Harry Sugiyama	3400m
49	2015	Autumn	Kono Satte Nandesuka? Team (4 people)	187	Gaku Sano	3600m
50	2016	Spring	Hideo Higashikokubaru	36	Tatsuya Ueda	3600m
51	2016	Autumn	Neko Hiroshi	34	(United Kingdom) Mo Farah	3600m
52	2017	Spring	Shōfukutei Shōhei	40	Kenji Moriwaki	3600m
53	2017	Autumn	Akira Hokuto	31	(United Kingdom) Mo Farah	3600m
54	2018	Spring	Miho Kimura	53	Yūta Shimoda	3600m
55	2018	Autumn	Nao Asahi	54	(Kenya) Wilson Kipsang Kiprotich	3600m
56	2019	Spring	Osamu Mukai	79	Kenji Moriwaki	3400m
57	2019	Autumn	Haru	48	Wataru Mori	3600m
—	2020	Spring	Not held (due to the COVID-19 pandemic)			
58	2020	Autumn	Tomohiro Kamiyama	34	Kazuki Sawai	4300m
59	2021	Spring	Mizuki Yamashita (Nogizaka46)	47	San'yūtei Yūko	3500m
60	2021	Autumn	Eiji Wentz	48	Kenji Fujimitsu	3500m
61	2022	Spring	Soshina (Shimofuri Myojo)	54	Hironori Kishimoto	3500m
62	2022	Autumn	Hiromasa Yashiki (New York)	31	Rinne Sugeta	3500m
63	2023	Spring	Akira Kawashima (Kirin)	41	Yoshio Kojima	3600m
64	2023	Autumn	Soshina (Shimofuri Myojo)	36	K (&Team)	3600m
65	2024	Spring	Soshina (Shimofuri Myojo)	38	Fumiya Sano (OWV)	4500m
66	2024	Autumn	Takushi Izawa	41	Yuta Shitara	4800m
Special	2024	Year-end	Takuya Kimura	220	Fumiya Sano (OWV)	4500m
67	2025	Spring	Takushi Izawa	52	Yūsuke Morimoto	4900m
68	2025	Autumn	Takushi Izawa	37	Akira Akasaki	4900m
Special	2025	Year-end	Meichi Narasaki	295	(Ethiopia) Yomif Kejelcha	4500m
69	2026	Spring	Junta Nakama (West)	38	Kohei Fukuyama	4900m
70	2026	Autumn	Ano	45	Mako Sakashita (NMB48)	4900m

=== Afterparty seasons ===
The series is hosted by Hiroiki Ariyoshi, and most of its participants are comedians. The quizzes also tend to feature more biting satire. For example, in 2025, one question asked, “Which of the following has never reached a speed of 165 km/h?” The four options were Shohei Ohtani, Roki Sasaki, Hideki Irabu, and Ryoko Hirosue. Ohtani and Sasaki had both recorded pitches of 165 km/h, while Hirosue had reportedly driven a car at more than 165 km/h. The correct answer was therefore Hideki Irabu. Hirosue’s management agency protested the quiz, and TBS issued an apology.

Broadcast Info				Quiz Results (Winner)		Quiz Results (Loser)	
No.	Year	Season	People	Winner	Score (pts)	Loser (Permanently Banned)	Score (pts)
1	2018	Spring	160	Jai (Instant Johnson)	16	Tatsumi Shindo (Bagayo Anatawa)	0
2	2018	Autumn	160	Hiroyuki Mayato (GAG)	12	Akihiko Miura (Identity)	0
3	2019	Spring	156	Yousuke Waga	17	Noda Crystal (Magical Lovely)	0
4	2021	Spring	32	Hiromasa Yashiki (New York)	11	Michio (Tom Brown)	2
5	2021	Autumn	32	Futoshi Seki(Time Machine No.3)	11	Yuki Hirako (Alco & Piece)	2
6	2022	Spring	32	Kosei Awaji (Kitsune)	14	Takashi Sakai (The Mummy)	0
7	2022	Autumn	32	Yuta Hatsuse (Nanamagari)	21	Hollywood Zakoshisho	5
8	2023	Spring	64	Kanta Takagi (Stretchees)	15	Kyonchii Kaneko (Party-chan)	3
9	2023	Autumn	66	Kuro-chan (Yasuda Circus)	13	Futoshi Komoto (Westland)	1
10	2024	Spring	88	Sugi-chan Saiko No.1 (Party-chan)	25	Bike Kawasaki Bike	1
11	2024	Autumn	85	Katamari Mizukawa (Koki Kaidan)	16	Kida (Gakudzuke)	2
12	2025	Spring	86	Takuya Tani (Pumpkin Potato Fries)	16	Hiccorohee	1
13	2025	Autumn	88	Souya Kaya (Kakaya)	12	Kensho Miyashita (Miyashita Kusanagi)	0
14	2026	Autumn	Forthcoming				

== Prizes ==
Below is a list of prizes for each season

Competition Prizes
	Final Placement			Periods	
Seasons	1st	2nd	3rd	Winner	Bonus Quiz
1	¥2,500,000	¥1,000,000	¥500,000	¥250,000	¥250,000
2	¥5,000,000	¥2,500,000	¥1,000,000	¥250,000	¥250,000
3 - 4	¥2,000,000	¥1,000,000	¥500,000	¥250,000	¥250,000
5 - 6	¥2,000,000	¥1,000,000	¥500,000	¥250,000	¥250,000
7	¥2,000,000	¥1,000,000	¥500,000	¥250,000	None
8 - 13	¥2,000,000	¥1,000,000	¥500,000	¥250,000	¥250,000
14 - 15	A resort condominium in Yuzawa, Niigata	¥1,000,000	¥500,000	¥250,000	¥250,000
16 - 18	¥3,000,000 of Luxury Goods	¥1,000,000	¥500,000	¥250,000	¥250,000
19 - 24	¥3,000,000 worth of Gold	¥1,000,000	¥500,000	¥250,000	¥250,000
25 - 26	¥6,000,000 of branded merchandise	¥1,000,000	¥500,000	¥250,000	¥250,000
27	A Gold Medal worth ¥3,000,000	¥1,000,000	¥500,000	¥250,000	¥250,000
28 - 31	¥3,000,000 of Luxury Goods	¥1,000,000	¥500,000	¥250,000	¥250,000
32	Alfa Romeo 159	¥1,000,000	¥500,000	¥250,000	¥250,000
33	Honda Civic Hybrid	¥1,000,000	¥500,000	¥250,000	¥250,000
34	Nissan Elgrand	¥1,000,000	¥500,000	¥250,000	¥250,000
35	A Nissan Murano and a Gold Medal	¥1,000,000 and a Silver Medal	¥500,000 and a Bronze Medal	¥250,000	¥250,000
36	¥3,000,000 worth of Bic Camera reward points	¥500,000	¥400,000	¥150,000	¥150,000
37 - 39	¥3,000,000 of Home appliances	¥500,000	¥400,000	¥150,000	¥150,000
40	¥1,000,000	¥500,000	¥400,000	¥150,000	¥150,000
41 - 43	¥3,000,000 of Home appliances	¥500,000	¥400,000	¥150,000	¥150,000
44	Toyota Ractis	¥500,000	¥400,000	¥150,000	¥150,000
45	¥1,000,000 and a Toyota Sai	¥300,000	¥100,000	¥200,000	None
46	Toyota Noah	¥300,000	¥200,000	¥150,000	¥150,000
47	Toyota Prius	¥300,000	¥200,000	¥150,000	¥100,000
48	Toyota Aqua	¥300,000	¥200,000	¥150,000	None
49	¥1,870,000 (¥10,000 x a final score of 187)	¥800,000	¥400,000	None	None
50 - 57	¥1,000,000	¥500,000	¥300,000	¥150,000	None
58	¥1,000,000	¥500,000	¥300,000	Unknown Cash Prize	None
59	¥1,000,000	¥500,000	¥300,000	None	None
60	¥2,000,000	¥1,000,000	¥500,000	None	None
61 - present	¥1,000,000	¥500,000	¥300,000	None	None
Afterparty 1–2	None	None	None	¥50,000	¥100,000
Afterparty 3	¥50,000	None	None	¥50,000	¥100,000
Afterparty 4 - present	¥50,000	None	None	¥100,000	¥50,000

== Versions ==
=== Japanese broadcasts ===
Japanese versions
Title	Japanese Title	Broadcast Period	Num. of Episodes
Quiz! Hit 25%	クイズ!当たって25%	June 28, 1991 – March 26, 1992	23 + 1 Special
All-Star Thanksgiving	オールスター感謝祭	October 5, 1991 – present	69 Specials
TV Cram School	テレビ進学塾	May 5, 1993 – September 15, 1993	20
Year-End Thanksgiving	年末感謝祭	December 31, 1997	1 Special
Midnight Thanksgiving	ミッドナイト感謝祭	March 30, 2014	1 Special
All Celebrity Carnival	オール芸人お笑い謝肉祭	October 9, 2016	1 Special
All Star Afterparty	オールスター後夜祭	April 1, 2018 – present	13 Specials
All Star Taiikusai	大晦日オールスター体育祭	December 31, 2024 – present	2 Specials

=== International versions ===
Despite Everybody's Equal receiving a very short production run of only 17 episodes, several licensed versions other than All-Star Thanksgiving also appeared in the 1990s in France, Hungary, Italy, Lebanon, Poland, Spain, and Quebec (Canada). The UK attempted to reboot the series under the title Whittle and saw 130 daily episodes through 1997. Despite the wide variety of attempts to keep the show going, all of these series suffered a similar fate and failed in under three years, with All-Star Thanksgiving being the only remaining series by 2003. Additional attempts to revive the show happened in Saudi Arabia and Quebec in 2007 and France in 2012, however these once again saw no longevity. As of 2024, France revived the series for a third time, this time following Quiz! Hit 25% and All-Star Thanksgiving's format of two large specials per year, with teams of competitors led by a celebrity captain.

During development, Celador was required to work extensively to create the technically used to allow a large-scale cast to all respond to questions simultaneously with low latency. Following Whittle in 1997, Celador decided to repurpose this technology while workshopping a new series that reused aspects of Everybody's Equal. They decided to shorten the group phase down to only a single question for a group of 10, while focusing on the winner of the group phase for an extended period of time, while allowing the audience to use the remaining input keys to assist the main competitor. This format would eventually be released in 1998 as the highly successful format Who Wants to Be a Millionaire?

=== Slippery Stairs ===
In 2016, All Star Thanksgiving debuted a new event called ぬるぬるトレジャーハンター (Nuru Nuru Treasure Hunter) based on skits that had appeared in various comedy shows such as Lincoln where six competitors were tasked with climbing a set of stairs covered in massage oil. In 2017, these segments went viral on YouTube and social media under the title "Slippery Stairs". Following this, several licensed adaptations of Slippery Stairs were launched, beginning with the Slippery Stairs World Championship on ESPN8 The Ocho, and Rush 4 Win: Slippery Stairs Philippines on Eat Bulaga!.

In 2020, Russia launched a licensed adaptation of Takeshi's Castle called Золото Геленджика (Gold of Gelendzhik), where the final battle of the original series was replaced with Slippery Stairs. The same change debuted in the third season of Takeshi's Castle Saudi Arabia in 2023.

== See also ==
- Moero! Top Striker
  A host of All-Star Thanksgiving Wakako Shimazaki sang the theme songs. The first time was October 1991 same as All-Star Thanksgiving, and the broadcast date are every Thursday same as the prototype Quiz! 25% Hit. This was from 19:30 to 20:00, TV Tokyo network.
- Samma's Super Karakuri TV
  Shiro Suzuki was appointed as the host of the Longevity Quick Push Quiz corner in the program, triggered by Quiz! 25% Hit. This was every Sunday from 19:00 to 20:00, TBS network.
