= Nejishiki =

1968 Japanese experimental manga by Yoshiharu Tsuge

- First page of Nejishiki

ねじ式
- Genre: Surrealism
- Manga
- Written by: Yoshiharu Tsuge
- Published by: Seirindo
- English publisher: NA: Drawn & Quarterly; UK: Drawn & Quarterly
- Magazine: Garo
- Published: June 1968
- Volumes: 1 (One-shot)
- icon

Nejishiki (Japanese: ねじ式), also Screw Style or Screwceremony, is a Japanese surrealist manga written and illustrated by Yoshiharu Tsuge. Nejishiki follows the story of an unnamed boy who wanders around several unfamiliar places to find a doctor who can fix his pierced artery. The manga was first published in the manga anthology magazine Garo in 1968 amidst a growing avant-garde art movement and student political radicalism. Tsuge has provided various accounts of the story's development, but often refers to it as a dream. During his time working on the story he was also employed as an assistant to Shigeru Mizuki and adopted different philosophical and aesthetic influences from his work.

Upon its publication, the story was popular among the avant-garde art culture, but was parodied and criticised by others. The story was popular among Garo's audience, and came to retrospectively define popular associations of the magazine's aesthetics. The manga has had an enduring influence and been adapted into a video game and a live action film. Analyses of the story often focus on the manga's tableau imagery, discussing it as an allegory for the afterlife, and identifying motifs of war, personal psychology, and rural poverty.

== Plot ==
A boy arriving ashore is stung by a jellyfish that pierces an artery in his left arm. He enters a nearby village and goes around looking for a doctor, but finds none. The boy then proceeds to follow a road of railway tracks in hope that it will lead him to the next village, only to get onto a train that brings him back to the village he first entered. He then decides to search the village again. This time, he encounters an old woman who tells him that the doctor he desires is in a nearby factory. He goes to a sweet-maker who lives on a lower floor in the factory. This sweet-maker he accuses of being his mother from before he was born. The boy then travels to a female gynecologist who resides in a bunker. He has sex with the gynecologist before getting his pierced artery fixed with a stopcock and spanner. The boy sails away in a motorboat.

== Development ==
=== Context ===
The publication of Garo magazine in 1964 allowed manga artists to explore a wider variety of subject matter than manga found in mass-market weekly magazines. Garo became synonymous with the growing popularity of gekiga—alternative manga for adults. This style of manga was within the same cultural sphere as the broader avant-garde art movement, and was particularly associated with the Japanese counterculture and left-wing student movement of the 1960s. Garo often failed to turn a profit until it was picked up by these countercultural student groups in the mid-late 1960s. Since 1965, Yoshiharu Tsuge had been a regular contributor to Garo. He formed relationships with Sanpei Shirato and Shigeru Mizuki during the 1960s, and to supplement his income, from 1966 he worked for Mizuki as an assistant on Weekly Shōnen Sunday's Akuma-kun (1966–1967) and Hakaba Kitarō (1965–1969).

=== Production ===
"What you see is just a summary of fuzzy images I've had in my head for a while. I wouldn't say I came up with that story as much as it was just there in my head. That's why, if I were so inclined, I could draw just as many stories like that as I want."

— Yoshiharu Tsuge, speaking with Fumiko Okada in COM magazine's July 1968 edition. Translation by Holmberg.

Tsuge provided various contradictory accounts of the story's development and has often resisted providing a complete explanation of its origin and meaning. However, from the 1970s onwards he began describing it as a dream. Soon after its initial publication in Garo he told COM magazine that the story's content had no particular origin; further, in October of that year, he claimed that its story was not intentionally influenced by his own life. In a 1976 pocket paperback he said that it was based on a dream he had while on the roof of a ramen shop. Tsuge has stated different motifs appearing in the dreams at different times in his life during discussions. He also denied consciously referencing anything to do with the Second World War or occupation of Japan. As with previous manga drawn for Garo, the story took the form of a one-shot comic that was 23 pages long.

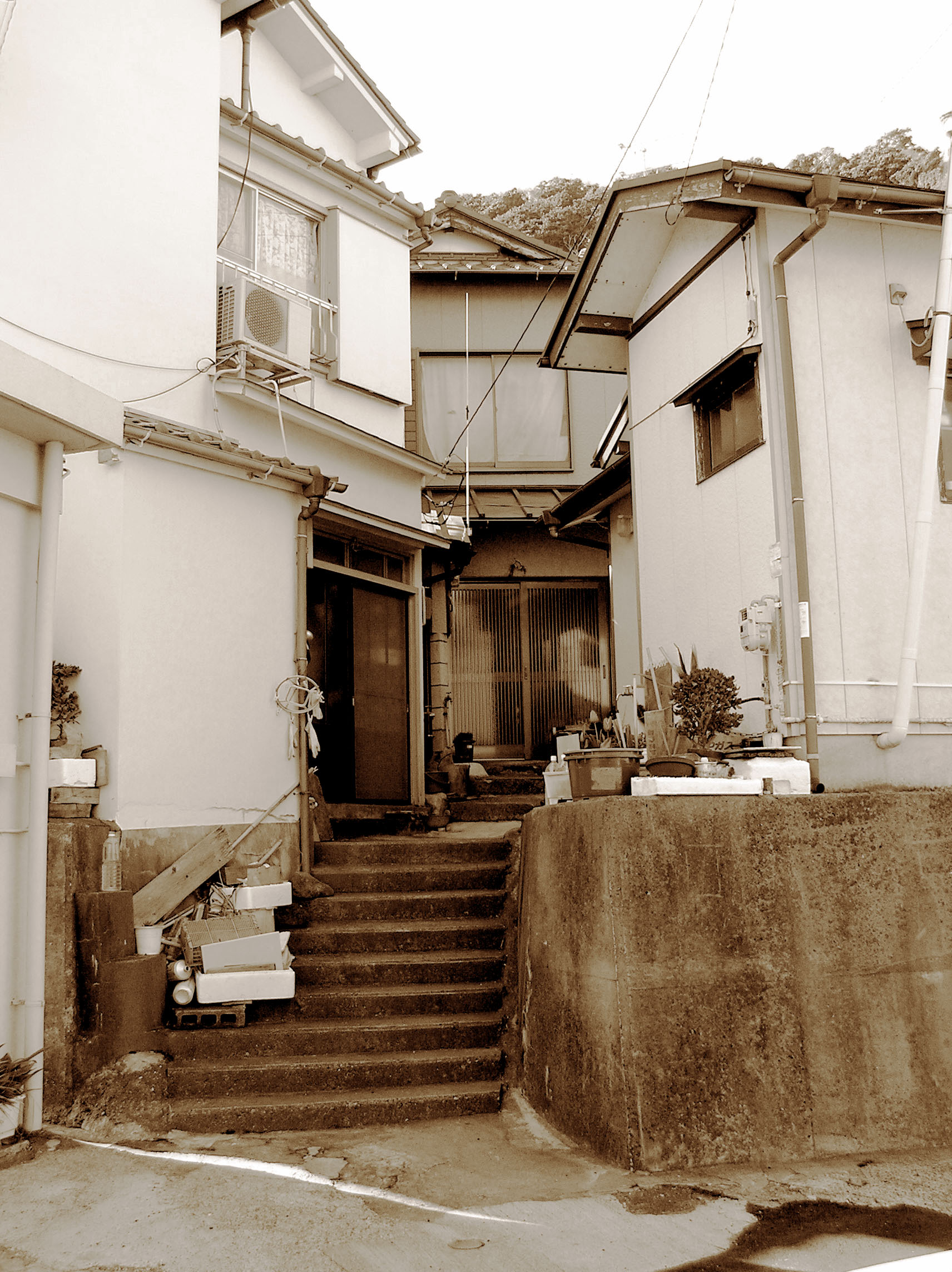
Recreated photograph of a location in Kamogawa, Chiba, depicted in Nejishiki

The creation of Nejishiki occurred in the collaborative environment that Tsuge found working with Shigeru Mizuki in his studio Mizuki Pro. During his time there, Tsuge had learnt and incorporated an interest in folklore and supernatural subjects. He also picked up Mizuki's process of copying photographs in detail; these photographs would be recreated in ink, and usually used as backgrounds or local details in panels. Some of the photos in Nejishiki were sourced from Ihei Kimura and Elliott Erwitt, mostly from popular photography magazines such as Asahi Camera, with images of the sex scene deriving from stills of the film A Fugitive from the Past (1965) Tsuge found in a film magazine. Members of Mizuki Pro would also assist in the creation of Tsuge's manga, with Yoshikazu Kitagawa drawing some of these detailed pictures in Nejishiki.

=== Publication ===
Tsuge submitted Nejishiki to Garo for publication in April 1968. The head editor, Katsuichi Nagai, initially did not want to publish it due to the story's sex scene. However, the managing editor Shinzō Takano insisted. The story was published in a special issue of Garo magazine in June 1968 that was devoted to Tsuge's work. It headlined the issue, which also contained eleven other stories by him, as well as essays by the manga critics Tadao Satō and Junzō Ishiko, and the avant-garde playwright Jūrō Kara. Nejishiki would be the nineteenth of the twenty-two manga Tsuge published in Garo.

The story was thereafter reprinted multiple times in different publications during the late 1960s, including Weekly Playboy and Manga Action. In 1972 the story was published under the title The Stopcock in the scholarly journal, Concerned Theatre Japan. It was subsequently translated into English by Bill Randall for the American magazine The Comics Journal for its February 2003 issue. In May 2022, Drawn & Quarterly announced that they licensed the manga for English publication. Nejishiki has also been distributed via online scanlations.

== Style and themes ==
Tsuge depicted an existential fear in Nejishiki.

Nejishiki is a surrealist, existential manga that eschews linear narrative and conventional plotting. Scholar of Japanese studies Sharon Kinsella identifies themes of rural poverty, industrialisation, and the Pacific War in the story's imagery. Translator Frederick Schodt also sees in Tsuge's stories an impoverished society, remarking that it juxtaposes a vision of Japan as being high-tech. The translator and manga scholar Ryan Holmberg identifies many motifs within the manga that have some provenance in autobiography, including setting the story by the sea, memories of air raids during the Second World War, and gaining money by working at grindstones and giving blood. Schodt likewise describes the story as being psychological and introspective. Regarding the narrative structure, however, Holmberg compares Nejishiki to the story of Jun'ichirō Tanizaki's Longing for Mother.

To Andrés Camacho López, a scholar of modern Japanese literature, the manga can be read in the context of the Sasebo protests between police and students that took place contemporaneously with the manga's publication. He places the story's imagery as part of a greater reimagining of rural Japan and tensions over the traditional moral ideology of the state. Camacho cites the story's first panel of the boy wading ashore below a plane as an association of the character with the kamikaze pilots of the Second World War, and his wanderings with the recreation of a rural society that no longer depends on old forms of agrarian economy. He compares the story to that of Urashima Tarō, describing the boy's journey as a nostalgic return home that nevertheless remains unfamiliar.

For Holmberg, the visual style of Nejishiki embodies a "tableaux gekiga", that is, a disconnect between the cause and effect between panels, and the use of photorealistic backgrounds to emphasise the relationship between characters and their environments. He describes the work as exemplifying a form of cosmic horror that derives from a fear of the unknown, drawing on Tsuge's description of existential horror that focus on still environments, sharp shadows, and horizons that stretch a long distance ahead. To Holmberg, this cosmic horror comes as a response to the visuals of Mizuki's contemporary manga that loosely depict eschatalogical iconography in the afterlife, or "Buddhist hell". In this analysis, the boy represents someone recently deceased who returns to the world of the living. He also places emphasis on the use of photographs, not as a form of interconnected contexts, but rather a way to assemble a dream-like imagery and structure.

== Reception and legacy ==
After the publication of Nejishiki, both the work and Tsuge became cult figures among people interested in avant-garde manga, and the culture more broadly. In 1967, he had been not thought of particularly highly by readers of Garo magazine, but by 1969 he was one of its most popular contributors. Nejishiki in particular has become largely synonymous with the style of Garo. The poet and scholar Taijirō Amazawa, writing about Nejishiki in 1969, described the setting as higan—meaning "the other shore", or afterlife—and analysed the story as a journey of the soul. Throughout the late 1960s and 1970s, the story was frequently parodied, with Osamu Tezuka criticising it as an "irrational gag manga". The success of Tsuge's manga at this time made him less desperate for money. He was unable to keep thinking of new stories, and according to himself, he became lazy.

Nejishiki was adapted as an 8 mm animated production in 1976, and a video game in 1989. In 1998, Japanese film director Teruo Ishii adapted the manga into a live-action film (also known as Wind-Up Type). Mamoru Oshii referenced it heavily in an episode of Vlad Love (2020) that contained homages to Tsuge's work. The manga was also referenced in the Japanese title of Takashi Murakami's Jellyfish Eyes (2013).
