= Erina Masuda =

Japanese free announcer (born 1985)

- 枡田 絵理奈
- Born: 25 December 1985 (age 40); Yokohama, Kanagawa Prefecture, Japan
- Other names: Masupan (マスパン); Erinyan (えりにゃん)
- Education: Seijo University Faculty of Letters and Arts Department of European Culture
- Occupation: Announcer
- Years active: 2008-present
- Agent: Libera
- Style: News; entertainment; sports
- Spouse: Shota Dobayashi (m. 2014)
- Children: 3
- Website: Erina Masuda

Erina Masuda (枡田 絵理奈, Masuda Erina; born 25 December 1985 in Yokohama, Kanagawa Prefecture) is a Japanese free announcer. She is a former TBS announcer from 2008 until 2015.

== Current appearances ==
=== Television ===
Year	Title	Network	Ref.
2013	Quiz Seikai wa Ichi-nen-go	TBS	

=== Radio ===
Year	Title	Network	Ref.
2016	Erina Masuda to ashita no Leader-tachi	Radio Nippon	
2018	Shibata Industries presents Limelight	@FM	
2020	Weekend Notebook	TBS Radio	

== Serialisations ==
Year	Title
2009	JCN Cable TV Magazine "Erina Masuda no masu eri Push"
2010	Weekly Playboy "TBS Announcer Erina Masuda no Mainichi ga Chris masuda!"
2010	Sportiva "WebSportiva Sport Announcer Athlete Report"

== Former appearances ==
=== Tarento era ===
Year	Title	Network
	Harajuku Ronchards	BS Asahi
2002	Yajima Plus	TV Asahi
2005	Hoshi monogatari	JFN
2005	Tameiki no Riyū	min.jam
2005	Zenryoku-zaka	TV Asahi
2006	Wednesday J-Pop	NHK BS2

Narration

Year	Title
2006	Yoi kono moto

Advertisements

Title	Ref.
Jet Securities	

=== Registered to TBS ===
==== Television ====
Regular

Year	Title	Ref.
2008	Dōbutsu Kisōtengai	
2008	Suiyō Nonfiction	
2008	Ana Can	
2008	JNN Evening	
2008	JNN Flash News	
2008	Jitan Seikatsu Guide Show	
2009	Ore-tachi! Quiz Man	
2009	Shōgeki! One Phrase	
2009	Chubaw desu yo!	
2009	Erina Masuda no TBS Channel Guide	
2009	Hiruobi!	
2010	News 23X	
2010	Quiz Talent Meikan	
2011	Sekai no minna ni Kiite mita	
2011	Uchimura to Zawatsuku yoru	
2012	TV Con Giro	
2012	Ippuku!	
2012	Pre-Battle!	
2013	Super Soccer	
2014	Honoo-no Taiiku-kai TV	

Spot appearances

Year	Title
2008	Pittanko Kan Kan
2008	Kaiun On Gakudō
2008	Channel Rock!
2008	Doors 2008
2008	Utaban
2008	Vermeer no Angō Navi
2008	Gacchiri Monday!!
2008	MegaDigi
2009	Japan Record Awards
2010	2010 Winter Olympics
2010	2010 FIFA World Cup
2010	Ōsama no Brunch
2010	2010 FIVB Volleyball Women's World Championship
2011	Ongaku no Hi
2012	2012 Summer Olympics
2012	Joshi-ana no Batsu
2012	Supanichi!
2013	All-Star Thanksgiving
2013	Sui Toku
2013	Japan Cable Awards
2013	Quiz Seikai wa Ichi-nen-go
2014	2014 Winter Olympics
2014	2014 FIFA World Cup
2014	Kiss My Fake
	Lincoln
Sanma no Super Karakuri-TV

==== As a free announcer ====
Year	Title
2016	Quiz Star Meikan

==== TV dramas ====
Year	Title	E
2012	Papadol!	3

==== Other stations ====
Year	Title	Network
2010	Waratte Iitomo!	Fuji TV
2010	AriKen	TV Tokyo
2012	Mezamashi	Fuji TV
2014	Gyōretsu no dekiru Hōritsusōdansho	NTV
2014	Peke×Pon	Fuji TV

==== Radio ====
Year	Title	Ref.
2008	Kodomo Ongaku Konkūru	
2008	Yuri Osawa no yūyū Wide	
2008	Exite Baseball Managers	
2008	TBS Radio News	
2009	Yutaka Arakawa: Day Catch!	
2010	Erina Masuda no Yokohama Monogatari	
2012	Ken Shimura no Yoru no Mushi	

== See also ==
- List of Tokyo Broadcasting System announcers
