= Yumi Morio =

Japanese actress (born 1966)

Yumi Kawai (河合由美, Kawai Yumi; born June 8, 1966 in Soka, Saitama Prefecture, Japan), better known by the stage name Yumi Morio (森尾由美, Morio Yumi), is a Japanese actress and singer employed by the talent management firm Stardust Promotion.

== Filmography ==
=== Film ===
- Karaoke Terror (2002)
- Lost in Ramen (2018)

=== TV dramas ===
- Nerawareta Gakuen (1982)
- Asobi Janai yo, Kono Koi ha (1986)
- Asunaro Hakusho (1993)
- Daisuki! Itsutsuko series (1999–2009)
- Influence (2021), Yoshiko Totsuka
- 1122: For a Happy Marriage (2024), Mizuki's mother

=== Anime ===
- Hiatari Ryōkō! (1987) (Kasumi Kishimoto)
- Kochira Katsushika-ku Kameari Kōen-mae Hashutsujo (1996) (Katrina Reiko Akimoto)

=== Other ===
- Hanamaru Market (????)
- Osoku Okita Asa ha... → Osoku Okita Hiru ha... → Hayaku Okita Asa ha... (????)
