= 1122: For a Happy Marriage =

Japanese manga series by Peko Watanabe

- First tankōbon volume cover
- Genre: Romance
- Manga
- Written by: Peko Watanabe
- Published by: Kodansha
- English publisher: NA: Kodansha USA (digital)
- Magazine: Monthly Morning Two
- Original run: September 21, 2016 – May 22, 2020
- Volumes: 7
- Television drama
- Directed by: Rikiya Imaizumi
- Produced by: Junko Satō
- Written by: Kaori Imaizumi
- Studio: Lat-Lon
- Licensed by: Amazon Prime Video
- Original run: June 14, 2024 – June 28, 2024
- Episodes: 7
- Manga

1122: Godai Fuufu no Baai
- Written by: Peko Watanabe
- Published by: Kodansha
- Magazine: Morning Two
- Original run: May 15, 2025 – present
- Volumes: 1
- icon

1122: For a Happy Marriage, simply known in Japan as 1122, is a Japanese manga series written and illustrated by Peko Watanabe. It was serialized in Kodansha's seinen manga magazine Monthly Morning Two from September 2016 to May 2020, with its chapters collected in seven tankōbon volumes.

A seven-episode live-action television drama adaptation premiered in June 2024.

== Characters ==
Otoya Aihara (相原二也, Aihara Otoya)
Portrayed by: Masaki Okada
Ichiko Aihara (相原一子, Aihara Ichiko)
Portrayed by: Mitsuki Takahata
Mizuki Kashiwagi (柏木美月, Kashiwagi Mizuki)
Portrayed by: Nanase Nishino
Shiro Kashiwagi (柏木志朗, Kashiwagi Shirō)
Portrayed by: Kengo Kora
Hiro Kashiwagi (柏木ひろ, Kashiwagi Hiro)
Portrayed by: Sōjirō Chiba
Megumi (恵)
Portrayed by: Kurumi Nakata
Yuri (ユリ)
Portrayed by: Misato Ugaki
Tamae (たまえ)
Portrayed by: Kaho Tsuchimura
Rei Ikebata (池端礼, Ikebata Rei)
Portrayed by: Hokuto Yoshino
Tōko Aihara (相原とう子, Aihara Tōko)
Portrayed by: Akiko Kikuchi
Mizuki's mother (美月の母, Mizuki no haha)
Portrayed by: Yumi Morio
Otoya's mother (二也の母, Otoya no haha)
Portrayed by: Yoshiko Miyazaki
Ichiko's mother (一子の母, Ichiko no haha)
Portrayed by: Jun Fubuki

== Media ==
=== Manga ===
Written and illustrated by Peko Watanabe, 1122: For a Happy Marriage was serialized in Kodansha's seinen manga magazine Monthly Morning Two from September 21, 2016, to May 22, 2020. Kodansha collected its chapters in seven tankōbon volumes, released from May 23, 2017, to July 20, 2020.

In North America, the manga is licensed for English digital release by Kodansha USA. The seven volumes were released from October 22, 2019, to July 6, 2021.

A spin-off manga series, titled 1122: Godai Fūfu no Baai (1122 五代夫婦の場合; '1122: The Case of Godai's Marriage'), started on the Morning Two website on May 15, 2025. The first tankōbon volume was released on February 20, 2026.

==== Volumes ====
| No. | Original release date | Original ISBN | English release date | English ISBN |
|---|---|---|---|---|
| 1 | May 23, 2017 | 978-4-06-388733-4 | October 22, 2019 | 978-1-64659-082-7 |
| 2 | November 22, 2017 | 978-4-06-510450-7 | November 12, 2019 | 978-1-64659-111-4 |
| 3 | May 23, 2018 | 978-4-06-511481-0 | December 10, 2019 | 978-1-64659-159-6 |
| 4 | November 22, 2018 | 978-4-06-513570-9 | January 14, 2020 | 978-1-64659-204-3 |
| 5 | May 23, 2019 | 978-4-06-515482-3 | February 11, 2020 | 978-1-64659-231-9 |
| 6 | November 22, 2019 | 978-4-06-517757-0 | March 31, 2020 | 978-1-64659-278-4 |
| 7 | July 20, 2020 | 978-4-06-519911-4 | July 6, 2021 | 978-1-63699-212-9 |

==== Spin-off ====
| No. | Japanese release date | Japanese ISBN |
|---|---|---|
| 1 | February 20, 2026 | 978-4-06-542504-6 |
| 2 | July 22, 2026 | 978-4-06-544265-4 |

=== Drama ===
A live-action television drama adaptation was announced on November 22, 2023. The drama is produced by Lat-Lon and directed by Rikiya Imaizumi, with scripts written by his wife Kaori and planning and production by Junko Satō, and stars Masaki Okada and Mitsuki Takahata as Otoya and Ichiko Aihara, respectively. It premiered its first three episodes on Amazon Prime Video on June 14, 2024, while episodes 4 and 5 became available on June 21 and episodes 6 and 7 on June 28.

== Reception ==
1122: For a Happy Marriage was nominated for the 12th Manga Taishō in 2019. In December 2019, Brutus magazine listed 1122: For a Happy Marriage on their "Most Dangerous Manga" list, which included works with the most "stimulating" and thought-provoking themes.

== See also ==
- Niko Tama, another manga series by the same author
