= Niko Tama =

Japanese manga series

- First tankōbon volume cover

にこたま
- Manga
- Written by: Peko Watanabe
- Published by: Kodansha
- Magazine: Monthly Morning Two
- Original run: May 22, 2009 – December 22, 2012
- Volumes: 5
- Television drama
- Directed by: Natsuki Seta; Keijirō Tsubakimoto
- Written by: Yōsuke Masaike
- Original run: December 26, 2025 – scheduled
- icon

Niko Tama (Japanese: にこたま) is a Japanese manga series written and illustrated by Peko Watanabe. It was serialized in Kodansha's seinen manga magazine Monthly Morning Two from May 2009 to December 2012, with its chapters collected in five tankōbon volumes. A live-action series adaptation is set to premiere in December 2025.

== Characters ==
Atsuko Asao (浅尾 温子, Atsuko Asao)
Portrayed by: Ai Hashimoto
Kōhei Iwaki (岩城 晃平, Iwaki Kōhei)
Portrayed by: Kōji Seto
Yūko Takano (高野 ゆう子, Takano Yūko)
Portrayed by: Manami Higa

== Media ==
=== Manga ===
Written and illustrated by Peko Watanabe, Niko Tama was serialized in Kodansha's seinen manga magazine Monthly Morning Two from May 22, 2009, to December 22, 2012. Kodansha collected its chapters in five tankōbon volumes, released from January 22, 2010, to April 23, 2013.

==== Volumes ====
No.	Release date	ISBN
1	January 22, 2010	978-4-06-372873-6
2	September 22, 2010	978-4-06-372931-3
3	August 23, 2011	978-4-06-387032-9
4	May 23, 2012	978-4-06-387105-0
5	April 23, 2013	978-4-06-387183-8

=== Drama ===
In November 2025, it was announced that the manga would receive a live-action series. It is directed by Natsuki Seta and Keijirō Tsubakimoto, with scripts by Yōsuke Masaike. The first two episodes are set to premiere on Fuji TV On Demand and Prime Video on December 26, 2025.

== See also ==
- 1122: For a Happy Marriage, another manga series by the same author
