= Shochiku Geino =

Japanese talent agency

Shochiku Geino Co., Ltd
- Native name: 松竹芸能株式会社
- Romanized name: Shōchiku Geino Kabushiki-gaisha
- Type: Subsidiary KK
- Industry: Service industry (entertainment)
- Genre: Tarento, comedian, entertainment industry management, theater, television drama production, event production etc.
- Founded: November 1, 1958
- Founder: Tadao Katsu
- Headquarters: Nichome 5-7, Kitakyuhoujimachi, Chūō-ku, Osaka, Japan; ZIP 541-0057
- Area served: Japan
- Key people: Yasushi Sekine (Representative director and president)
- Owner: Shochiku
- Number of employees: 61
- Website: www.shochikugeino.co.jp

Shochiku Geino Co., Ltd (松竹芸能株式会社, Shōchiku Geino Kabushiki-gaisha) is a Japanese talent agency headquartered in Chuo-ku, Osaka. It was founded in 1958 under the conglomerate Shochiku Co., Ltd and focuses on talent management for comedians and tarento. The agency mainly associates itself with acts and entertainment under the Kamigata culture.

== Notable talents ==
=== Comedians ===
==== Groups ====
- America Zarigani (Tetsuya Yanagihara, Yoshiyuki Hirai)
- Masuda Okada (Hidehiko Masuda, Keisuke Okada)
- TKO (Takehiro Kimoto, Takayuki Kinoshita)
- Yasuda Dai Circus (Yasuda Dancho, Kuro-chan, HIRO)
- Yoiko (Masaru Hamaguchi, Shinya Arino)

==== Solo ====
- Kintalo
- Buruma Konno
- Kenji Moriwaki
- Shōfukutei Tsurube II

=== Other tarento ===
- Chiemi Hori (singer, actress)
- Atsushi Oyagi (former rugby player)
- Masakatsu Funaki (actor, wrestler)
- Homare Suguro (actor, singer)

=== Former talents ===
- Othello (Tomoko Nakajima, Mahomi Matsushima)
