= Kenji Moriwaki =

Japanese comedian and radio personality (born 1967)

- 森脇 健児
- Born: February 5, 1967 (age 59); Hirakata, Osaka, Japan
- Other names: Ken-chan (健ちゃん); Kenji (健児); Hashiru Otoko (走る男); Moriken (モリケン); Post-Sanma Akashiya (ポスト明石家さんま, Posuto Akashiya Sanma)
- Education: Hirakata Municipal Tonoyama First Elementary School; Hirakata Municipal First Junior High School; Rakuminami High School; Momoyama Gakuin University Department of Sociology
- Occupations: Comedian, radio personality
- Years active: 1984–
- Agent: Shochiku Geino
- Known for: Honoo-no Taiiku-kai TV; Waratte Iitomo!; Zamaa Kankan!; Yume ga Mori Mori; Rakurabu.; Rakurabu R; Hashiru Otoko
- Height: 1.71 m (5 ft 7 in)
- Awards: Upper Comedy Topic Award (1989)

Kenji Moriwaki (森脇 健児, Moriwaki Kenji; born 5 February 1967, in Hirakata, Osaka, Japan) is a Japanese comedian and radio personality.

Moriwaki is represented with Shochiku Geino. He graduated from Hirakata Municipal Tonoyama First Elementary School, Hirakata Municipal First Junior High School, Rakuminami High School, and Momoyama Gakuin University. Moriwaki is a resident of Kyoto. In 2010 he became the Special Advisor to Kyoto Miyama High School. Moriwaki is now married and has one son and daughter.

== Biography ==
During high school Moriwaki held a number of voluntary planning events in the local live house Blow Down in Hirakata.

He passed the 1st Shochiuku Geino Tarento Audition during his second year in senior high school. In the 17 March 1984 Moriwaki joins Shochiku Geino and later in June he debuted in a vaudeville show. Later he became an apprentice to Hayato Wakai. In 1988 Moriwaki and Wakai turn into a duo in Zamaa Kankan! and the Kansai Local programme Kenji Moriwaki no Seishun Vegetable in the Kinki area.

Later in the 1990s he appeared in dramas and presenting variety programmes and he stepped down from Waratte Iitomo! and later became a presenter in Yume ga Mori Mori, but the programme didn't air nationwide and in 1999 the series returned in the Kinki area.

== Current appearances ==
=== TV series ===
Year	Title	Network	Notes
2013	News 610: Kyo Ichi Nichi	NHK Kyoto	Tuesday Corner
2014	Moriwaki Densetsu	KBS, Sun TV	
	Honoo-no Taiiku-kai TV	TBS	Irregular appearances
2015	Hitmon!!	KTV	

=== Radio ===
Year	Title	Network	Notes
2004	Kenji Moriwaki no U Work Weekly	Radio Kansai	
2004	Konchi wa Kon-chan Ohirudesuyo!	MBS Radio	Thursday monthly "Ichiguest"
2006	Kenji Moriwaki no Saturday Stadium	KBS Radio	
2014	Yona Yona...	ABC Radio	Monday personality

=== Internet series ===
Year	Title
2006	Kenji Moriwaki no Gakuya Hanashi
2014	Moriwaki Owarai Dōbutsuen

=== Essays ===
Year	Title
2011	Daily Sports "Sō Shisō Ai"

=== Magazines ===
Title
Netchū! Rikujō-bu "Kenji Moriwaki no Netchū! Rikujō-bu Sōdan-shitsu"
Riku Maga Jr. "Kenji Moriwaki no Shitsumon Corner"

=== Advertisements ===
Year	Title
2016	Nissin Foods Cup Noodles O Baka e no Shissō

== Former appearances ==
=== Variety series ===
Year	Title	Network	Notes
	Wide You	MBS	
1985	You Goban Mada?	ABC	
1988	Zamaa Kankan!	YTV	
1989	Idol Kyōwakoku	TV Asahi	3rd presenter
1991	Sakurakko Club	TV Asahi	
1991	Waratte Iitomo!	Fuji TV	
1991	Waratte Iitomo Special Issue	Fuji TV	
1991	Waratte Iitomo! Tokudai-gō	Fuji TV	
1992	Yume ga Mori Mori	Fuji TV	
1992	Tamori no Vocabula Tengoku	Fuji TV	
1992	Kenji Moriwaki no Sessa Taku Maru!!	ABC	
1993	Professional Baseball News	Fuji TV	
1993	Hatsumōde! Bakushō Hit Parade	Fuji TV	
	Sanma no Nan Demo Derby	TV Asahi	
	Naruhodo! The World	Fuji TV	
	Discovery of the World's Mysteries	TBS	
1994	Maido! Ongaku Las Vegas	TV Asahi	
1995	Kasou Taishou	NTV	
1995	FNS Super Special TV Yume Rettō	Fuji TV	
1995	Quiz Nipponjin no Shitsumon	NHK TV	
1995	The Warame De Pon	Fuji TV	
1996	Doyō Tokushū	NHK TV	
1996	27-jikan Challenge TV	TV Asahi	
1997	Wai Wai Tea Time	TBS	
1997	Pro Sportsman No.1	TBS	
1998	Mezamashi TV	Fuji TV	
2001	Hiru Doki Nippon Rettō	NHK TV	Assistant
2001	TV Hakubutsukan: Sorette Honto!	THK	Reporter
2001	Chichinpui Pui	MBS	
2001	Variety: Seikatsu Emi Hyakka	NHK	
	Niji Goji	TNC	
	News Signal	Sun	
2002	Ōi, Nippon	NHK-BS2	
	Rakurabu.	KBS	
2003	Rakurabu R	KBS	
2003	Pooh!	TBS	
2003	Tsūkai! Everyday	KTV	
2003	Money no Tora	NTV	Volunteer
2004	Ikinari! Kogane Densetsu.	TV Asahi	
2005	Viking: The Ultimate Obstacle Course	Fuji TV	
2005	Kikaku Kōjō Nariagari	TBS	
2005	Shumi yūyū	NHK-E	
2008	Hashiru Otoko	To-Mei-Han Net 6	
2009	Hashiru Otoko II	To-Mei-Han Net 6	
2010	Sekai Waraeru! Journal	TBS	
2010	Hashiru Otoko F	To-Mei-Han Net 6	
2010	G Wars	Fuji TV	
2011	24 Hour Television	NTV	
2011	Kansai Tokushū	NHK TV	
2012	Hashiru Otoko Joshi-bu	To-Mei-Han Net 6	
2013	Hashiru Otoko: The Final	To-Mei-Han Net 6	

=== TV drama ===
Year	Title	Role	Network	Notes
1991	Aitai Toki ni Anata wa Inai...		Fuji TV	
1992	Kimi no Tame ni Dekiru Koto		Fuji TV	
1992	Yonimo Kimyōna Monogatari: Oyaji		Fuji TV	
1993	Onegai Darling!		Fuji TV	
1993	Onegai Demon!		Fuji TV	
1994	Hanjuku Tamago	Satoshi Maruyama	Fuji TV	
1994	Kimi ni Tsutaetai: Sotsugyō II		MBS, TBS	
1995	For You		Fuji TV	
1998	Ten Urara	Akihiko Takayama	NHK	
2003	Love Judge	Tamaki	TBS	
2007	Mito Kōmon	Sutekichi	TBS	Episode 22
2008	Chiritotechin		NHK	Episode 83
2014	Roosevelt Game	Saburo Murano	TBS	
2016	Osaka Kanjō-sen: Hito-eki-goto no Ai Monogatari	Policeman	KTV	Part 1 Episode 4
	Shinusa			

=== Films ===
Year	Title	Role	Notes
1999	Minami no Teiō: Hasan Kinyū-ya Koroshi		
2002	Red Harp Blues		
2007	Chikyū no Heso	Hitoe Kogo's director	Cameo

=== Radio ===
Year	Title	Network	Notes
1985	MBS Young Radio	MBS Radio	Debut
	High Young Kyoto	KBS Radio	
	Free Campus Radio	KBS Kyoto	
1988	ABC Radio Funky's	ABC Radio	Thursday appearance
1989	Seishun Vegetable	KBS Kyoto	
1989	Kenji Moriwaki to Naoki Uraguchi no Super Gang	TBS Radio	
1989	Hara Yojire Agohazushi Renmei	NBS	Monday appearances
1990	Moriwaki-Yamada no Panic Shiyouze! Tokyo Hara Hara Gyātēzu	NBS	
	Hikaru Ijūin no Oh! Deka Night	NBS	
1998	Kenji Moriwaki no Sunday Meeting	KBS Radio	
1999	Kenji Moriwaki no Totsugeki! Nippon Rettō	KBS Radio, HBC Radio, TBC Radio, Radio Nippon, SF, Radio Kansai, RCC, KBC Radio, MBC	
	Kyoto Gogoichi	KBS Radio	
2009	Kenji Moriwaki to Takeyuki Hara no Moshimo Saiban-in!	CBC Radio	
2009	Gogoichi	CBC Radio	Monday appearances
2014	Nobuhiko Otani: Kikimasu!	NBS	"Kiki Master" in Wednesdays

=== Advertisements ===
Year	Title	Notes
1993	Mandom Gatsby	Co-starring with Eisaku Yoshida
	Join Juice	Co-starring with Masato Yamada
	Abeno Apollo	
	Nissan New Atlas	
	Mikakuto Ochichi Candy, Osatsu Doki, Kirei, Fiber Gummy, Gummycan GL	
	Sapporo Brewery	
	Otsuka Pharmaceutical Five Mini	
2009	Ito-Yokado	

=== VHS ===
Title
Yume ga Mori Mori super live
Yume ga Mori Mori supecial live
Shijō Saidai no Live

=== DVD ===
Title
Hashiru Otoko: Hokkaido-Tohoku
Hashiru Otoko: Kanto-Koshinetsu
Hashiru Otoko: Kanto-Tokai
Hashiru Otoko: Kansai-Chūgoku Shikoku
Hashiru Otoko: Kyushu-Okinawa
Hashiru Otoko II: Hajimehashi
Hashiru Otoko II: Kaisō
Hashiru Otoko II: Kansō

=== CD ===
Title	Notes
"Ma-natsu no Fantasy", "Ma-aki no Fantasy"	
Landing Beam, Ma-natsu no Fantasy	Participated with Maki Ohguro

=== Books ===
Title
I Love You ni Kaete
Kenji Moriwaki Sweater Book
Hashiru Otoko

=== Magazines ===
Title
Nikkan Running Magazine "Kenji Moriwaki Rikujō Kyōgi-bu"
