= Chiemi Hori =

Japanese singer, actress, and entertainer

Chiemi Hori 堀 ちえみ
- Also known as: 尼子智栄美 (Amako Chiemi, married name)
- Born: 堀智栄美 (Hori Chiemi); February 15, 1967 (age 59); Higashi-ku, Sakai, Osaka Prefecture, Japan
- Occupations: Singer, actress, entertainer
- Years active: 1982–1987; 1989–
- Labels: Horipro, 1983–1987; Shochiku Geino, 1989–present
- Spouse: Katsuki Amako (m. 2011)

Chiemi Amako (尼子 智栄美, Amako Chiemi; née Hori (堀), born February 15, 1967, in Higashi-ku, Sakai, Osaka Prefecture, Japan), better known as Chiemi Hori (堀 ちえみ, Hori Chiemi), is a Japanese singer, actress, and entertainer represented by Shochiku Geino. Her stage name is a hiragana version (ちえみ) of her given name written in kanji (智栄美), also pronounced Chiemi.

== Career ==
In 1981, Hori was the Grand Prix winner of the 6th Annual Horipro Scout Caravan. She debuted the following year in 1982 with the single "Shiokaze no Shōjo" (潮風の少女, "The Sea Breeze Girl"). She steadily gained popularity and was tipped to be one of the most recognized idols after producing a string of Oricon top-5 hits and starring in a few well-received dramas.

In 1983, she starred in her breakout role as Chiaki Matsumoto, a prospective cabin attendant in the TBS drama "Stewardess Monogatari" (スチュワーデス物語; A Stewardess' Tale). Playing opposite Morio Kazama and Nagisa Katahira, Hori's performance drew high ratings. Her catchphrases in the series: "Instructor!" and "I'm just a slow, clumsy turtle" won the top prizes in the annual Japanese "buzzwords-of-the-year" contest for 1984.

Also in 1984, Hori was selected to perform in the NHK Red and White Song Festival. In 1985, she released her highest selling single "Ri・Bo・N" (Ribbon), which peaked at number 2 on the Oricon chart.

In 1987, at the age of 20 years old, Hori announced that she was quitting show business. She claimed that she was burnt out, could not compete with younger artists, and claimed to have experienced everything that came with being an idol. However, at the same time, the previous month's edition of Friday romantically linked Hori with musician Tsugutoshi Gotō (who was then married to former singer Midori Kinouchi). She stated that she desired to return to her hometown of Osaka and was not considering a return to the industry.

However, in late 1989, Hori returned to the industry, this time under Shochiku Geino productions. The following year, she cut back her work to focus on her personal life. From mid-1990s onward, she began to appear in TV programs catered to housewives, and took on some minor acting roles. In 2001, she restarted her music career by releasing an LP single.

In 2005, Hori, along with Iyo Matsumoto and Yu Hayami (all of whom debuted in 1982), formed the unit Cutie☆Mommy. They released a para para version of the Mickey Mouse March, which had significant success (ranking 72nd on the Oricon charts). The song was featured in the Just Dance Wii 2 game for the Wii, and was also used on segments on the Disney Channel in the US. Hori left the unit in 2007, due to her relocating to the Kansai region.

== Illness and recovery ==
In February 2019, Hori announced that she has stage 4 tongue cancer and tumors on the lymph nodes on the left side of her neck. She underwent surgery to have the tumors and half of her tongue removed. The surgery was successful after two surgeries throughout the month of March. However, she announced the following month that during one of her follow-up appointments, she was diagnosed with stage 1 esophageal cancer. Following an additional round of surgery, her esophageal cancer was declared in remission (stage 0) by the end of the month.

On October 21, 2019, Hori released a biography entitled Stage For ~ Tongue Cancer: From Stage 4 to the Stage of Hope (Stage For〜舌がん『ステージ4』から希望のステージへ), documenting her battle with cancer. The following month on November 3, she made her first public appearance post-surgery to promote the book. During this appearance, it was revealed that due to the extensive oral surgeries, her speech had become very heavily impeded (and she proceeded to apologize for her slurred speech) but also announced that she plans to undergo extensive speech therapy and voice lessons with a goal to be well enough to perform for her 40th Anniversary in 2022.

In January 2020, Hori made a full-scale return to the entertainment industry, making television appearances. Through her blog (and later via her Instagram account, which she opened in August 2022), she provided updates on her voice lessons and speech therapy. However, she was not satisfied enough with her progress to hold her 40th Anniversary Concert in 2022 as hoped.

Nevertheless, she continued to upload videos of her singing her singles with her home karaoke machine on Instagram, documenting her improvement. These videos received positive feedback, thus encouraging her to change her decision and have a 41st Anniversary Live Tour instead ("40th plus 1 Anniversary", as titled) as a way of showing gratitude to the fans who encouraged her to keep singing. The tour began in February 2023 and continued throughout the year, making various performances throughout Japan.

On February 27, 2024, Hori announced on her blog and social media that her tongue cancer was declared to be in complete remission, ending the five-year battle.

On April 16, 2024, Hori made a post on Instagram announcing her new single, the first new original release after the effects of her oral surgeries, entitled "Fuwari". Announced with a release date of May 5, 2024, the single will also include re-recorded versions of two of her fan favorite songs: "Ri・Bo・N" (her best-selling single from 1985) and "Lai Lai Lai" (the B-side of her 1984 single "Shiroi Handkerchief").

== Family ==
Hori has been married three times. In 1989, she married her first husband (a physician based in Osaka), who fathered her three sons (born in 1990, 1992 and 1993 respectively). They divorced in 1999.

In May 2000, she married her second husband (a magazine company employee). He was the father of her fourth son (born 2000) and her eldest daughter (born 2002). That marriage also ended in divorce in June 2010.

On December 11, 2011, she wedded Katsuki Amako (operating officer of SANKYO) at a ceremony held at Meiji-Jingu Shrine. This marriage was also noteworthy for the fact that in addition to the five biological children from her first two marriages, she also became the stepmother of the two children from her husband's previous marriage.

== Filmography ==
=== TV series ===
Regular appearances

Year	Title	Network	Notes
	Chi-chin Puipui	MBS	Thursday appearances
	Shittoko!	MBS	Irregular guest appearances
	Kiyoshi Nishikawa no go Endesu!	THK	Irregular guest appearances
1993	Tsūkai! Everyday	KTV	Friday appearances
2000	Kon'ya mo anata no Partner	NHK E	
2003	Oshare Kōbō	NHK E	
2008	Shūmatsu no Tanken-ka Yume Rashinban	ABC	Saturday appearances
2009	That's a Dramatic Change! Season II	ABC	
2009	Omoikkiri Don!	NTV	
2010	Shiritagari!	Fuji TV	

Other appearances

Year	Title	Network	Notes
2005	Quiz! Hexagon II	Fuji TV	Quasi-regular appearances
2008	Chiemi Hori 25-shūnen! Star to Gourmet de Dai Kansha-sai	KTV	
	Variety Seikatsu Shouhyakka	NHK G	
2011	Downtown no Gaki no Tsukai ya Arahende!!	NTV	

=== Dramas ===
Year	Title	Role	Network	Notes
1982	Mechanko Mickey	Mizuki Hanamura (Mickey)	TBS	Lead role
1983	Stewarddess Monogatari	Chiaki Matsumoto	TBS	Lead role
1984	Uchi no Ko ni Kagitte...		TBS	Episode 2; Special appearance
1984	Abare Kyūan	Oshino	KTV	Episode 8
1985	Star Tanjō	Junko Kaga	Fuji TV	Lead role
1986	Kazoku Hakkei		Fuji TV	
1986	Hanayome Ishō wa Dare ga Kiru	Chiyo Yukimura	Fuji TV	Lead role
1986	Mito Kōmon	Ohana	TBS	Part 16, Episode 25
1997	Amakara Shan	Saki Shimizu	NHK	
2001	Minami no Teiō			
2003	Teru Teru Kazoku	Setsuko Anzai	NHK G	
2010	Flunk Punk Rumble	Sei Shinagawa	TBS	

=== Former TV appearances ===
Year	Title	Network	Notes
1982	Parinko Gakuen No.1	TBS	
1985	Drift Bakushō	Fuji TV	
1986	Ken Shimura no Shitsurei Shi Masu!	NTV	

=== Films ===
Year	Title	Role	Notes
1985	The Sound of Waves		
2009	Iro Soku ze ne Reishon		
2010	Seikazoku Yamato-ji		
2012	Eiga Yōkai Ningen Bemu	Naoko Natsume	

=== Books ===
Year	Title	Publisher	Notes
2019	Stage For ~ Zetsugan "Stage 4" kara Kibou no Stage e	Fusosha Publishing	Autobiography
