= Miki Fujitani =

Japanese actress (born 1973)

- 藤谷 美紀
- Born: Makiko Kanaya (金谷 満紀子); September 15, 1973 (age 52); Nagoya, Aichi, Japan
- Occupation: Actress
- Years active: 1987–present
- Agent: Oscar Promotion
- Height: 162 cm (5 ft 4 in)
- Children: 2
- Website: https://www.oscarpro.co.jp/#/profile/entry/468

Miki Fujitani (藤谷 美紀, Fujitani Miki; born Makiko Kanaya (金谷 満紀子, Kanaya Makiko) on September 15, 1973 in Nagoya, Aichi Prefecture) is a Japanese actress and former Idol Singer. In addition to her many live-action film and television roles, she had a prominent voice role as Kamiya Kaoru in the Rurouni Kenshin anime series, and as Chun-Li in Street Fighter II The Movie.

== Filmography ==
=== Live-action film ===
- Rabu sutōrī o kimi ni (ja:ラブ・ストーリーを君に, A love story to you) (1988)
- Another Way - D kikan joho (ja:アナザー・ウェイ ―D機関情報―, Anazā u~ei ― D kikan jōhō) (1988)
- Garasu no naka no shōjo (ガラスの中の少女, Girl in the Glass) (1988)
- Nozomi Witches (live-action, 1990)
- Bloom in the Moonlight (1993)
- Onna-Zakari (女ざかり) (1994) – Chie Minami
- Ashita (あした, Goodbye for Tomorrow) (1995)
- Aa! ! Hananoōendan (ja:嗚呼!!花の応援団, Ah! Flower of Cheering) (Heisei version, 1996) – Yuki
- Going West (ＧＯＩＮＧ ＷＥＳＴ 谰へ, Going uesuto nishi e) (1997, directed by Kan Mukai) – Mirai Ito
- Neji-shiki (ja:ねじ式, Screwed) (1998) – Kuniko
- Yasha no mai (夜叉の舞い) (2000, directed by Ikuo Sekimoto) – Xiao Chun
- Merdeka 17805 (2001) – Sanae Miyata
- Kusa no ran (ja:草の乱) (2004) – Koma Inoue
- Nihon no Aozora (ja:日本の青空) (2007) – Toshiko Suzuki
- Fumikonoumi (ja:ふみ子の海) (2007) – Chiyo Awaji

=== Live-action television ===
1980s

- Bishōjo gakuen (美少女学園) (1987) - cast member
- Kirari Bishojo (ja:キラリ!美少女) (1988) - cast member
- Iemitsu to hikoza to isshintasuke - tenka no ichidaiji (家光と彦左と一心太助－天下の一大事) (1989)
- Sō ten'nenshoku baraeti KITANO TV (ja:総天然色バラエティー 北野テレビ, Total Natural Color Variety - Kitano TV) (1989) - cast member
- Little Boy Little Girl (ja:リトルボーイ・リトルガール, Ritorubōi ritorugāru) (1989)
- Manga de yomu koten (ja:まんがで読む古典, Manga classics to read) (1989) – Episode series: Sarashina Nikki

1990s

- Rinrin to (ja:凛凛と) (1990)
- Kanrishokukōkaku (管理職降格) (1990)
- Anne of Green Gables (CX golden movie theater, 1990) – Anne (dub)
- Kazunomiyasamaotome (和宮様御留) (1991)
- Dotō no tenka tori saitō dōzan (怒涛の天下取り 斎藤道三) (1991)
- Aniki ni kanpai (兄貴に乾杯) (1991)
- Love You Forever (ja:君だけに愛を (テレビドラマ), Kimi Dake ni Ai o Love Forever) (1991) – Akane Murakami
- Anne of Green Gables (sequel, CX golden movie theater, 1991) – Anne (dub)
- Dangerous Job for a Schoolgirl (ja:女子高生!キケンなアルバイト, Joshi kōsei! Kiken na Arbeit) (1991) – Hazuki Sasayama
- Hontōniattakowaihanashi ~ Karuizawa no bōrei (ja:本当にあった怖い話, Really scary ghost story) (1992) – Episode: "Kurizawa burei (軽井沢の亡霊, Kurizawa ghost)
- Bokunokanojo wa heian bijin (ボクの彼女は平安美人) (1992)
- Wada ka no deka (ja:はだかの刑事) (1993) – Aki Yaguchi (Hiroki Matsukata's character's daughter)
- Sakana no yō ni (魚のように) (1993)
- Mori Ranmaru sengoku o kakenuketa wakashishi (ja:森蘭丸〜戦国を駆け抜けた若獅子〜) (1993)
- Keyakitōrinohitobito (ja:欅通りの人びと) (1994) – Rumi Iwasaki
- Musuko yo yomigaere! (息子よ甦れ!) (1995)
- Nekoma ni kieta hanayome (猫魔に消えた花嫁) (1995)
- Hallelujah House (ハレルヤハウス, Hareruyahausu) (1995)
- On'na-tachi no sensō (女たちの戦争) (1995)
- Hāto ni S (ハートにＳ) (1995)
- Hamidashi bengoshi tatsumi shirō, keiba-ba gyaru satsujin jiken! (はみだし弁護士・巽志郎、競馬場ギャル殺人事件！) (1996)
- Udemakuri kangofu monogatari ⑤ (腕まくり看護婦物語⑤) (1996)
- Himawari (ひまわり) (1996) – Aoi Kuroda
- Mitsuhiko Asami series (浅見光彦シリーズ) (1996) – Maiko Tsuda – TBS series, Part 6: Otaru Satsujin Jiken (小樽殺人事件, Otaru Murder)
- Inochi tsunaide (ja:命つないで) (1996) – Yuka Asakura
- Kyōtogion-iri muko keiji jiken-bo (ja:京都祇園入り婿刑事事件簿) series (1997-2005) – Saeko Mimura – 12 episodes
- Nagoya yomeiri monogatari (ja:名古屋嫁入り物語, Nagoya Marriage Story) (1997) – Part 9 Kogena endan gowasanda (名古屋嫁入り物語9～こげな縁談ご破算だ)
- Kurumaisu no kinmedaru (車椅子の金メダル) (1998) – Kazu Kitamura
- Setsunai (ja:せつない) (1998) – Part 4: Yasusoku (約束, Promise)
- Asami Mitsuhiko series (浅見光彦シリーズ) (1998) – CX series Part 6 hyōhaku no gakujin (漂白の楽人)
- Kai (櫂, Oar) (1999) – Yoshi Tomomi
- Echigo Aidzu satsujin rūto (越後・会津殺人ルート) (1999)
- On'na jiken kisha Saeko (女事件記者・冴子, Woman investigative reporter Saeko) (1999)
- Satsujinhirōen (殺人披露宴, Murder Reception) (1999) – Kaoru Kotobuki

2000s

- Tsuiseki 6 (追跡６) (2000)
- hagurekeijijunjōha (ja:はぐれ刑事純情派) (2000) – Season 13, Episode 3
- yukizurinomachi (ja:行きずりの街, Strangers in the City) (2000) – Masako Tezuka
- Kariya oyako shirīzu (ja:狩矢父娘シリーズ) (2000–present) – Kazumi Kariya - 20 episodes
- ai wa owaran bai (愛は終らんバイ) (2001)
- Karakuri jiken jō (ja:からくり事件帖) (2001) – Okane Fukui – Episode 4 Ten'nyo no yōjinbō (天女の用心棒)
- Furin chōsa-in Katayama Yumi (ja:不倫調査員・片山由美, Infidelity Investigator Yumi Katayama) (2002) – Machiko Mimura – Episode 3 Kyoto Geisha Murder (京都芸妓殺人事件!, Kyōto geigi satsujin jiken)
- Eye of the Storm (ja:新・愛の嵐, Shin ai no arashi) (2002) – Hikaru Saegusa
- Mi no keiji no ai no jiken-bo dai sakusen Shinano Tōkai-ji dōkyūsei renzoku satsujin jiken (みの刑事の愛の事件簿大作戦 信濃・東海路同級生連続殺人事件) (2003)
- Misshitsu kara hajimaru koi (密室から始まる恋) (2003)
- Kyōtochiken'noon'na (ja:京都地検の女) (2003) – Season 1, Episode 2
- Mito Kōmon (ja:水戸黄門) (2003, 2011) – Episode 8
- Burakkujakkuniyoroshiku (ja:ブラックジャックによろしく) (2004) – Noriko Kodama – Episode Dai shi geka-hen (第四外科編)
- Tōkyōchikentokusōbu kyōjujiken (東京地検特捜部・教授事件) (2004)
- Wakaba (ja:わかば) (2004) – Episodes 74-77
- Keshōnoumi (化生の海) (CX, 2005) – Mitsuhiko Asami series 20th commemorabtion program
- Tsugarukaikyō misuterī kōro (ja:津軽海峡ミステリー航路) (2005) – Episode 4
- Keibuho narusawa ryō yabu dan (警部補 鳴沢了 破弾) (2005)
- Totsukawa keibu shirīzu (ja:十津川警部シリーズ, Inspector Tatsukawa series) (2005) – Episode 34 Kanazawa Kaga satsui no tabi (金沢加賀殺意の旅)
- Matsumoto seichō supesharu kuroi jukai (松本清張スペシャル 黒い樹海, Seicho Matsumoto special - Black Sea of Trees) (2005)
- Muenzakakottōten (夢縁坂骨董店) (2005) - Episode 3
- Mokuhi (黙秘) (2006)
- Keishichō kuromame konbi (ja:警視庁黒豆コンビ) (2006) - Episode 2
- Akita shinkansen Komachi renzoku satsujin (秋田新幹線こまち連続殺人) (2006)
- yukemuri dokutā hana oka Mariko no onsen jiken-bo 3 (湯けむりﾄﾞｸﾀｰ華岡万里子の温泉事件簿３) (2007) – Asami Moriyama
- Ofukuro sensei no shinryō nikki (おふくろ先生の診療日記) (2008) - Rieko Tachibana - Episode 1
- Keishichō sōsaikka fukuhara keibu (警視庁捜査一課 福原警部) - Kazumi Tsukbaki (2009–11) - 3 episodes

2010s

- shindai tokkyū Kashiopea satsujin jiken (寝台特急カシオペア殺人事件) (2010) – Aki Oyama

=== Anime ===
- Street Fighter II: The Animated Movie (1994) – Chun-Li
- Rurouni Kenshin (1996–98) – Kamiya Kaoru
- Rurouni Kenshin: The Motion Picture (1997) – Kamiya Kaoru
- Rurouni Kenshin: Reflection (2001–02) – Kamiya Kaoru
- Rurouni Kenshin: New Kyoto Arc (2011–12) – Kamiya Kaoru

=== Dubbing ===
- ER – Debbie (Mary McCormack)

== Discography ==
=== Singles ===
| Title | Year | Record Code | B-side |
|---|---|---|---|
| "Tenkōsei" (転校生) | 1988 | | "Wink no shutter" (ウインクのシャッター) |
| "Ōen shiteru kara ne" (応援してるからね) | 1988 | | "Natsu yasumi" (夏休み) |
| "Tatta hitori no kamisama" (たったひとりの神さま) | 1988 | | "Watashi potchi" (わたしぽっち) |
| "Miseinen" (微成年) | 1989 | | "Sekaijū no tokei wo tomete" (世界中の時計を止めて) |
| "Kimi no namae" (君の名前) | 1989 | | "Kimi no namida nara ī yo" (君の涙ならいいよ) |
| "Ichiban kagayaite ne" (いちばん輝いてね) | 1989 | | "Seishun no klaxon" 青春のクラクション |
| "BELIEVE IN MYSELF" | 1990 | | "Ironna Kokoro" (いろんな心) |
| "Momen no handkerchief" (木綿のハンカチーフ) | 1990 | | "Lodge de matsu Christmas" (ロッヂで待つクリスマス) |
| "Silent Love (Hitotsuki hayai Christmas)" (Silent Love 〜ひと月はやいクリスマス〜) | 1991 | | "Midori no kisetsu" (みどりの季節) |

=== Albums ===
| Title | Year | Record Code |
|---|---|---|
| Foundation (ファンデーション) | 1988 | |
| Roomy | 1989 | |
| In Season | 1989 | |
| Tenkōsei Complete Singles (転校生 コンプリート・シングルス) | 2015 | |

| Preceded by none | Japan Bishōjo Contest; 1987 | Succeeded by Naomi Hosokawa |
