= Fumie Nakajima =

Japanese actress and tarento

- 中島 史恵
- Born: 14 June 1968 (age 57); Nagano Prefecture, Japan
- Education: Nagano Prefectural College
- Occupations: Actress; tarento
- Years active: 1993–present
- Agent: Oscar Promotion
- Height: 1.7 m (5 ft 7 in) (2008)
- Spouse: Akira Watanabe (m. 2010)

Fumie Nakajima (中島 史恵, Nakajima Fumie; born 14 June 1968, in Nagano Prefecture) is a Japanese actress, gravure idol and tarento. She is represented by the Oscar Promotion Company.

== Filmography ==
=== TV series ===
| Year | Title | Network | Notes |
|---|---|---|---|
| | Asada! Nama desu Tabi Salad | ABC, TV Asahi | Bi-weekly; Overseas reporter |
| | Doyō Special | TV Tokyo | Occasional appearances (Note: She is also the first performer of Local Rosen Bus Noritsugi no Tabi.) |
| | Ī Tabi Yume Kibun | TV Tokyo | Occasional appearances |
| | Nippon! Ī Tabi | TV Tokyo | Occasional appearances |
| | Pro Yakyū News | Fuji TV | Agency caster |
| | RC Dock | BS Fuji | |
| 2008 | Asa wa Vitamin! | TV Tokyo | Thursday appearances |
| | Chachamaru & Fumie no wanda Furo | Tabi Channel | |
| 2010 | Big Variety | TV Tokyo | Reporter |
| 2010 | Anata mo Artist | NHK-E | As a student with Fuyuki Moto |

=== TV drama ===
| Year | Title | Role | Network | Notes |
|---|---|---|---|---|
| 2002 | Shin Aka kabu Kenji Funsen-ki 14-16 | Ryoko Gyoten | TV Asahi | |
| 2006 | Yaoh | Hiromi Oikawa | TBS | |
| 2007 | Kodoku no Kake | | TBS | |
| 2008 | Guren Onna | Mizuho Gotoda | TV Tokyo | Episode 8; Guest |
| 2008 | Saikon Itchokusen! | Yuri Takamizawa | TBS | |
| 2009 | Onna kakekomi Tera: Keiji Mizuho Oishi 2 | | TV Tokyo | |
| 2010 | Ekiben Keiji Tokunosuke Jinbo | Satomi Saegusa | TBS | |
| 2011 | Shiawase-iro no Hanabi | Masami Yamashita | BS-TBS | |
| 2013 | Otorisōsa-kan Shiho Kitami 17 | Junko Matsubara | TV Asahi | |
| 2013 | Mikaiketsu Jiken | Mieko Tsunoda | NHK | |

== Films ==
| Year | Title | Role | Notes |
|---|---|---|---|
| 2007 | Himitsu Sennyū Sōsa-kan: Honey & Bunny | Benitaka | |
| 2008 | Himitsu Sennyū Sōsa-kan: Wildcats in Strip Royale | Benitaka | |
| 2009 | Chikashitsu | Misako Takanashi | Lead role |
| 2010 | Gothic & Lolita Psycho | Kayako | |

=== Radio ===
| Title | Network |
|---|---|
| Joli Birthday | FM Tokyo |

== Solo photo albums ==
| Year | Title |
|---|---|
| 1997 | FN |
| 1998 | Nioi: Fragrance |
| 2000 | in Natural |
| 2001 | thirty three |
| 2003 | Fumie |
| 2008 | Sankyu! 39 |

== Videography ==
| Year | Title |
|---|---|
| 2000 | Silhouette |
| 2001 | Thirty, Three |
| 2003 | Liberty |
| 2008 | Sankyu! |

== Bibliography ==
| Year | Title |
|---|---|
| 2007 | Fumie Nakajima no Love Body Method: Kirei o tsukuru Body Remake Exercise |

== Music videos ==
Title
Kaoru Kurosawa "Tōi Yakusoku"
