= Anna Hachimine =

Japanese actress (born 1989)

- 鉢嶺 杏奈
- Born: July 19, 1989 (age 36); Tokyo, Japan
- Other name: An-chan (あんちゃん)
- Occupation: Actress
- Years active: 1998–present
- Agent: Trustar
- Spouse: Unknown (m. 2020)
- Children: 2
- Relatives: Nana Hachimine (sister)

Anna Hachimine (鉢嶺 杏奈, Hachimine Anna; born July 19, 1989 in Tokyo, Japan) is a Japanese actress who is represented by the talent agency, Trustar. Her sister is Nana Hachimine.

== Biography ==
In June 1998, Hachimine she was affiliated by Five Eight. She debuted in an advertisement for Disney's Party Hero.

In 2003, Hachimine participated in the Fuji Television variety show, Doll's Vox.

In 2010, she moved from Five Eight to Oscar Promotion.

In February 2020, she left Oscar Promotion. In June, she joined Trustar.

On her birthday, July 19, 2020, she announced her marriage. On November 22, 2021, she gave birth to a first baby boy. On July 17, 2024, she gave birth to a second baby boy.

== Filmography ==
=== TV series ===
Year	Title	Role	Network	Notes
1999	Oni no Sumika	Ayumi Kato (childhood)	Fuji TV	Episodes 2 and 4
2000	Wakareru 2-ri no Jiken-bo	Ai Shichihara	TV Asahi	
2000	Tekkōki Mikazuki	Saori Izumi (childhood)	Fuji TV	Episode 2
2000	Bengoshi Mariko Sako no Yuigon Sakusei File 3	Mariko Sako (childhood)	TBS	
2001	Toto no Sekai: Saigo no Yasei-ji	Makoto Hanyuda (childhood)	NHK-BS2	Episode 1
2001	Koko Dake no Hanashi	Rumi	TV Asahi	
2001	Es Kikenna Tobira: Ai o Tejō de Tsunagu Toki	Naoko Kagawa	TV Asahi	
2002	Kamen Rider Ryuki	Mika Hamasaki	TV Asahi	Episodes 31 and 32
2003	Omiya-san Dai 2 Series	Mina Takamura	TV Asahi	Episode 8
2003	Nikoniko Nikki	Kei Kotoriasobu (childhood)	NHK	Episodes 5 to 11
2003	Yumemiru Budō: Hon o Yomu Onna	Asami Ogawa (childhood)	NHK	Episodes 1 and 2
2006	Taigan no Kanojo		WOWOW	
2006	Itsuwari no Hanazono	Shihori	THK	Episode 53
2008	Keishichō Sōsaikka 9 Kakari Season 3	Kana Goto	TV Asahi	Episode 4
2008	Dramatic-J Birthday: Tanjōbi ni Okotta 4-tsu no Monogatari	Miho Higashiyama	KTV	
2012	Teen Court: 10-dai Saiban		NTV	Episodes 10 to Final Episode
2012	Dora Asa Satsujin Jiken	Dora Asa	NHK	
2012	Kamen Rider Wizard	Chizuru Manaka	TV Asahi	Episodes 14 and 15
2013	Onsen Okami Futari no Jiken-bo 2	Eri	TV Tokyo	
2013	Ofukuro Sensei no Shinryō Nikki 6		MBS, TBS	
2015	Doctors 3 Saikyō no Meii	Rinko Kubo	TV Asahi	Episode 8
2015	Kyūkyū Kyūmei-shi Saori Makita 10	Sumire Takeshita	TV Asahi	
2015	Omokuri Kantoku: O-Creator's TV Show		Fuji TV	
2015	Keiseizaimin no Otoko Korekiyo Takahashi	Makiko Takahashi	NHK	
2016	Kamogawa Shokudō	Asuka Mizuki	NHK	Episode 3
2016	Gin to Kin	Misa Aoki	TV Tokyo	Episodes 4 to 6
2019	Emergency Interrogation Room Season 3	Mika Arai	TV Asahi	Episode 8
2020	Okashina Keiji 20	Kana Tamaki	TV Asahi	
2021	Kotaro Lives Alone	Hiromi	TV Asahi	Episode 1

=== Films ===
Year	Title	Role	Notes
2000	Tale of Genji Asaki Yumemishi: Live in a Dream	Murasaki no Ue (childhood)	
2002	Kaze to Daichi to Nashinoki to	Moyuru Makihara	
2015	Attack on Titan	Minami	
2020	Minori Yuku		
2022	The Last 10 Years		
2022	My Life, Mama Life	Saori Mishima (lead role)	
