= Everybody's Equal =

- Also known as: Whittle
- Genre: Game show
- Created by: Chris Kwantes; Mitchell Symons
- Presented by: Chris Tarrant (ITV); Tim Vine (Channel 5)
- Composers: Keith Strachan (1989–91); Rick Turk (1997)
- Country of origin: United Kingdom
- Original language: English
- No. of series: 2 (ITV); 2 (Channel 5)
- No. of episodes: 17 (ITV); 130 (Channel 5)

Production
- Running time: 30 minutes (inc. adverts)
- Production companies: Celador Productions in association with Thames (1989–91); Grundy (1997)

Original release
- Network: ITV
- Release: 7 June 1989 – 22 July 1991
- Network: Channel 5
- Release: 31 March – 30 December 1997

Everybody's Equal is a game show that originally aired on ITV from 7 June 1989 to 22 July 1991 and hosted by Chris Tarrant. It was later revived under the name Whittle and aired on Channel 5 from 31 March to 30 December 1997 with Tim Vine as host. Versions also existed in many European countries, plus Canada. Elements of the show resemble Tarrant's future hit Who Wants to be a Millionaire?, particularly its "Fastest Finger First" game; in addition, the US-based mobile game HQ Trivia.

Versions were broadcast in Canada, France and Japan.

== Format ==
200 contestants were asked a question with four options and those who got it right were asked another. This continued until fewer than ten players survived, at which point they face four questions which were worth £50 each. If more than ten players remained after the sixth question, the ten fastest players went through. The player who correctly answered the final question the fastest went on to play the final round. The winning contestant was to place four things into the correct order, to win £1,000. If they got it wrong, the money was divided equally between all the other contestants.

On the original version of the show, Chris Tarrant would routinely "name and shame" the contestants who voted for the most outlandish answers – most memorably the first game of the first show where all but one contestant voted for the correct answer. At the start of each show, the host would introduce the “Four to Follow” contestants, pre-selected by the computer as the most likely to win the game, and regularly check in to see if they were still in the game as it progressed.

In the revival, likely due to lower budgets, the main prize is £250 or £500, depending if the contestant wanted to take on the offer. This time if one of the ten remaining contestants were out of the game, they would have to wear a "Whittle Mask", which consists of a purple "W" from the show's logo graphic on a yellow disc with eye holes to see out of.

== Reception ==
Hillary Kingsley of the Daily Mirror praised the show, writing, "Everybody's Equal is good fun, the questions aren't too taxing, we can all play along at home and the contestants seem relatively normal, unlike the brain donors they sometimes get on Big Break. But the biggest plus is Tarrant himself. I'm not sure I'd want to buy a used car from him, but at least he doesn't take himself seriously. With some of the jackets he wears, he daren't."

In a 1989 review, the columnist Norman Harper wrote, "It is a novel idea and one which works rather well. It is a shame that people who answer wrongly are singled out for the glare of ridicule, but presumably they knew the risks before they agreed to take part. It is also worth watching for the vigorous and prolonged handshaking offered by host Chris Tarrant to each week's victor." In a 1991 review, Harper stated, "The format is as trite as every other gameshow and there is a flaw of sorts in that the audience can't develop a rapport with the contenders — because there are 200 contenders. The strength of Everybody's Equal is host Chris Tarrant. It was a colleague who pointed out that, alone among TV hosts, Tarrant doesn't patronise the participants, and it's true. He doesn't use them as foils for well-rehearsed wit and the show has a relaxed, matey, pleasing air as a result. Good stuff."

== Transmissions ==
=== ITV ===
| Series | Start date | End date | Episodes |
|---|---|---|---|
| 1 | 7 June 1989 | 19 July 1989 | 7 |
| 2 | 30 July 1990 | 22 July 1991 | 10 |

=== Channel 5 ===
| Series | Start date | End date | Episodes |
|---|---|---|---|
| 1 | 31 March 1997 | 27 June 1997 | 65 |
| 2 | 29 September 1997 | 30 December 1997 | 65 |

== International versions ==
| Country | Name | Host(s) | Channel | Dates aired |
|---|---|---|---|---|
| Canada (Quebec) | Que le meilleur gagne | Alain Dumas; Grégory Charles | Radio-Canada | 1993–1996; May 2007 |
| France | Que le meilleur gagne | Laurence Boccolini; Nagui; Laurent Petitguillaume; Philippe Lellouche with Anne-Sophie Girard | La Cinq (1991–1992); Antenne 2 (1992); France 2 (1992–1995; 2012–2015); M6 (2024–2025) | 4 March 1991 – 22 December 1995; 2012–2015; 2024–2025 |
| Greece | Ο Καλύτερος Κερδίζει; O kalyteros kerdizei | Miltos Makridis; Yolanda Diamandi | ANT1 | 1994–1997 |
| Hungary | 100-ból egy | András Vízy | RTL Klub | 1997–1999 |
| Italy | Vinca il migliore | Massimo Giuliani | Telemontecarlo | 28 June 1993 (pilot) |
| Italy | Campionissimo | Gerry Scotti | Italia 1 | 5 July – 15 September 1993 |
| Italy | Vinca il migliore | Gerry Scotti | Canale 5 Italia 1 | 1996 |
| Japan | クイズ!当たって25% Quiz! Atatte 25% | Shinsuke Shimada; Wakako Shimazaki | TBS | 28 June 1991; 17 October 1991 – 26 March 1992 |
| Japan | オールスター感謝祭; All Star Thanksgiving Festival | Koji Imada; Shinsuke Shimada; Wakako Shimazaki | TBS | 5 October 1991 – present |
| Japan | テレビ進学塾; TV Prep School | Shinsuke Shimada; Sato B-saku | TBS | 1993 |
| Japan | オールスター後夜祭; All Star After Party | Hiroiki Ariyoshi; Kazumi Takayama | TBS | 2018–present |
| Lebanon | خليك معنا; Khalik Mana | Serge Zarqa | MTV | 1999–2002 |
| Poland | Sto plus jeden | Grzegorz Halama | Nasza TV | 1998 |
| Saudi Arabia | كل يوم مليون; Kil Youm Malyoon | Turki Al-Shabanah | Rotana Khalijia | 2007–2008 |
| Spain | Aquí jugamos todos | Miriam Díaz-Aroca; Ramón García | TVE 1 | 1995–1996 |
