= Oscar Promotion =

Japanese talent agency

Oscar Promotion CO., Ltd
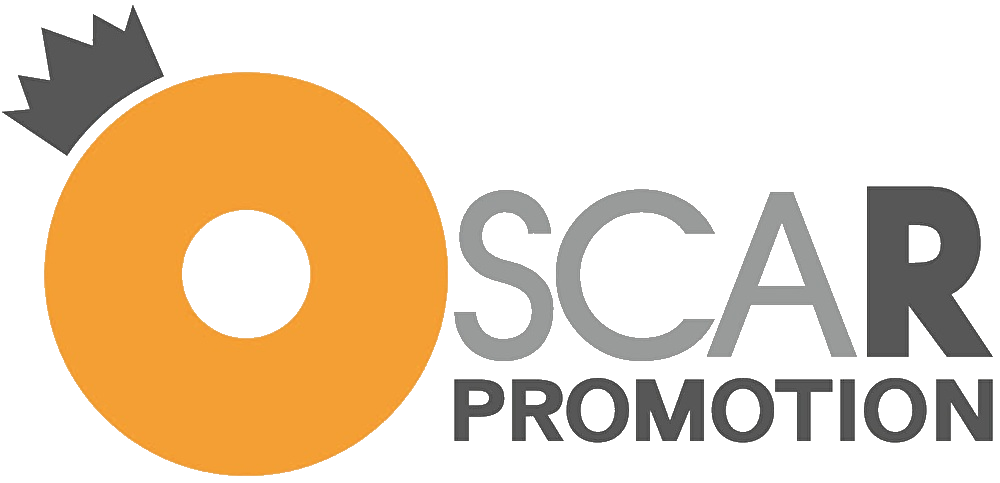
- Native name: 株式会社オスカープロモーション
- Type: Kabushiki gaisha (Joint-stock company)
- Traded as: Unlisted
- Industry: Service industry (entertainment)
- Genre: Tarento management, entertainment and media planning and production
- Founded: March 26, 1970
- Headquarters: Aoyama Palacio Tower 5th Floor, 3-Chome 6-7, Aoyama, Minato, Tokyo, Japan; ZIP 107-0061
- Area served: Japan
- Key people: Seiichi Koga (Representative chairman)
- Number of employees: 180 (Not including talents)
- Website: www.oscarpro.co.jp

Oscar Promotion Co., Ltd (株式会社オスカープロモーション) is a Japanese talent agency headquartered in Aoyama, Minato, Tokyo. It was founded in 1970 and manages talents in a variety of fields including modelling and acting. The company has a large roster of talents, making it one of the largest talent agencies in Japan alongside Johnny's and Yoshimoto. There are over 6000 people working or affiliated as staff and talent with Oscar Promotion. The company is also involved in television production with numerous drama shows.

They are known for hosting the Japan Bishōjo Contest since 1987, a beauty contest which introduced many famous actresses and models.

Talents under the agency are forbidden to be in a relationship until they are 25 years old.

== Notable talents ==
=== Female talent ===
- Hina Aoyama
- Eri Imai
- Aya Ueto
- Miyuki Ono
- Kazusa Okuyama
- Reon Kadena
- Mayuko Kawakita
- Aki Kawamura
- Rei Kikukawa
- Natsumi Kiyoura
- Mitsuko Kusabue
- Koharu Kusumi
- Ayano Kudo
- Keiko Kojima
- Kumiko Goto
- Aiko Sato
- Hikaru Takahashi
- Emi Takei
- Michiko Tanaka
- Fumie Nakajima
- Asumi Nakada
- Shizuka Nakamura
- Natsuki Harada
- Hitomi Korenaga
- Yuko Fueki
- Miki Fujitani
- Nicole Fujita
- Naomi Hosokawa
- Miyu Honda
- Marin Honda
- Moeko Matsushita
- Miki Maya
- Aki Mizusawa
- Misato Ugaki
- Miki Yanagi
- Noa Tsurushima
- Yurina Kawaguchi
- Risa Taneda
- Ayaka Imoto
- Haruka Tateishi
- Sakurako Okubo

=== Male tarento ===
- Hiroki Iijima
- So Okuno
- Ryō Tamura
- Konosuke Takeshita
- Kaito Nakamura
- Shun Nishime
- Akihisa Shiono
- Yasuyuki Maekawa
- Kohji Moritsugu

== Former Oscar Promotion artists ==
- Aguri Ōnishi
- Akane Hotta
- Anna Hachimine
- Asuka Kishi
- Ayame Goriki
- Azusa Kishimoto
- Erena Mizusawa
- Fuka Koshiba
- Hiroaki Murakami
- Ichika Osaki
- Izumi Mori
- Jun Hasegawa
- Jun Shibuki
- Kimiko Ikegami
- Marie Kai
- Megumi Yokoyama
- Mikie Hara
- Miyu Yoshimoto
- Noboru Kaneko
- Noriko Aota
- Saki Fukuda
- Sakura Komoriya
- Shio Kisui
- Shioli Kutsuna
- Tamiyo Kusakari
- Taro Shigaki
- Youn-a
