= Wind-Up Type =

1998 Japanese drama film directed by Teruo Ishii

- English film poster
- Directed by: Teruo Ishii
- Written by: Teruo Ishii
- Based on: Screw Style by Yoshiharu Tsuge
- Produced by: Teruo Ishii
- Starring: Tadanobu Asano; Miki Fujitani; Yūko Fujimori; Kazuhiko Kanayama; Tsugumi
- Music by: Kenichi Segawa
- Production company: Bitters End
- Distributed by: Toei Company
- Release date: June 17, 1998 (Japan)
- Running time: 87 minutes
- Country: Japan
- Language: Japanese

Wind-Up Type (Japanese: ねじ式, Hepburn: Nejishiki), also known as Screwed, is a 1998 Japanese drama film directed by Teruo Ishii. It is an adaptation of Tsuge Yoshiharu's 1967 manga Screw Style.

== Cast ==
- Tadanobu Asano as Tsube
- Miki Fujitani as Kuniko
- Yūko Fujimori as Nurse
- Kazuhiko Kanayama as Kimoto
- Tsugumi as Chiyoji Kobayashi
- Mutsumi Fujita as Woman at Yanagiya
- Mika Aoba as Stripper
- Masumi Hara as Man with Lloyd Glasses
- Kaoru Mizuki as Gynecologist
- Nijiko Kiyokawa as Candy Seller
- Hideo Sunazuka as Station Attendant
- Tetsurō Tamba as Landlord
- Jtarō Sugisaku as Village Drinker
- Yuki Umihara as Village Drinker
- Reiko Miwa
- Shinzo Takano as Village Chief
- Tetsuya Hirosaki as Separd
- Hidenori Miki as Doctor

== Production ==
The film is Ishii's eighty-first film. It stars Tadanobu Asano and Miki Fujitani.

When asked "What is it about Tsuge's manga that makes you want to adapt them to film?", Ishii answered: "He shows the very poor side of society in Japan, that's what interests me."

== Release and reception ==
The film has also been released under the title Screwed.

A review in Variety states that this "Story about a manga artist who goes on a 'Saragossa Manuscript'–like dream odyssey will leave most non-Japanese viewers baffled."
