= Eri Imai =

Japanese actress and model (born 1971)

- 今井 恵理
- Born: January 26, 1971 (age 55); Yawata, Kyoto
- Occupation: Actress
- Years active: 1994–present
- Agent: Oscar Promotion
- Height: 167 cm (5 ft 6 in)
- Spouse: Yūjin Nomura (m. 1999)
- Children: 1

Eri Imai (今井 恵理, Imai Eri; born January 26, 1971 in Yawata, Kyoto) is a Japanese actress and model. In April 1994, she won the "Shape Up Girl Audition" Grand Prix, and made appearances with three other models under the "Shape Up Girl" name. She made numerous appearances on television, film, v-cinema, photobooks and on stage during the 1990s. She and her husband, actor Yūjin Nomura, announced the birth of their first child, a son, in October 2009. At the end of that year Imai appeared in the "Shape-Up Girl" calendar with her fellow alumni of that group. She returned for this calendar the following year.

== Partial filmography ==
- 泥棒貴族 Body Hunter (1996)
- Guard Dog (1997)
- 仁義13 地獄の墓標 (1997)
- 俺の空 刑事編 (1998)
- 俺の空 刑事編 闇の制裁 (1998)
- 日本暴力地帯 美しき野望 (1998)
- デコトラ・パチンカー 恋の連チャン大爆走 (1999)
- 京浜抗争史外伝 最後の組長 (2000)
- Mito Kōmon (2003 TV series)
