= Laurent Petitguillaume =

French radio and television host

Laurent Petitguillaume (born 21 February 1960 in Tours) is a French radio and television host. He debuted in 1983 on the RFM radio, then on Skyrock alongside Supernana, before hosting the show Duel au soleil on RTL during the summer holidays. He then presented various variety shows on television, including Scènes de ménage, Zygomusic, Que le meilleur gagne, La Fureur... He hosted the RFM Party 80 tour and is also the patron of several associations : Petits Princes and Ciel ma Sup' .

== TV presenter ==
- Trivial Poursuit (France 2)
- Music Art (TF6)
- Le latino mag (RFM TV)
- 72 heures (TF6)
- Le Kadox (France 3)
- Quelle galère (TF1)
- MCM news (MCM)
- Radio mag (MCM)
- Zygo Machine (M6)
- Hit 92 (M6)
- Ces années-là (France 2)
- Dance Machine (M6)
- Côté Maison (France 3)

== TV series ==
- Léa Parker (M6)
- Sous le soleil (TF1)

== Radio ==
- Sixième sens (RTL)
- Double appel (RTL)
- Tiroir secret (RTL)
- Challenges de l'été (RTL)
- Rio Bravo (RTL)
- Le Cékoidon (RTL)
- Le Quotidien 9h - 13h (RFM)
- Le Quotidien 16h - 20h (RTL2)

== Theater ==
- Le molière malgré lui by Frédéric Smektala
- Des pommes pour Ève by Gabriel Arout

== Filmography ==
- La gente Honrada by Bob Decout
- Prisme by Yves Brodsky
- Monsieur Guibolle by Francis Salomon
- Le renégat by Johan Lallemand and Julien Ferrand
- Philosophale by Farid Fedjer
- Y'a des jours comme çà by Cédric Bounkoulou
- L'étalon by Sébastien Mermoz
- Autour du cercle by Michael Alalouf
