= Keiko Kojima =

Japanese essayist and radio personality

- 小島 慶子
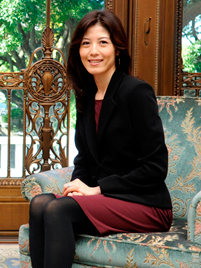
- Kojima in 2011
- Born: July 27, 1972 (age 53); Perth, Australia
- Education: Hino Municipal Misawa Base Elementary School; Gakushin Women's Middle and High School; Gakushuin University
- Occupations: Tarento, essayist, radio personality
- Years active: 1995–
- Agent: Cast Plus
- Known for: Goro Deluxe; Heart Net TV; Nikkei Plus 10; Non Stop!; The Interview; Strike TV; All Night Nippon Gold
- Height: 1.72 m (5 ft 8 in)
- Children: 2
- Website: Official website

Keiko Kojima (小島 慶子, Kojima Keiko; born July 27, 1972, in Perth, Australia) is a Japanese tarento, essayist, and radio personality represented by Oscar Promotion. She is a former TBS announcer from 1995 to 2010. She has two children. Her hobbies are wearing kimono, riding horses, and perform pilates.

== Filmography ==
=== TV series ===
| Year | Title | Network | Notes |
|---|---|---|---|
| 2011 | Goro Deluxe | TBS | |
| 2012 | Heart Net TV | NHK E | |
| 2013 | BS News Nikkei Plus 10 | BS Japan | Thursday and Friday appearances |
| 2013 | Non Stop! | Fuji TV | |
| 2013 | The Interview | BS Asahi | |
| 2013 | Strike TV | TV Asahi | Irregular appearances |
| 2014 | Asian Times | BS Japan | |
| 2014 | White Labo: Keishichō Tokubetsu Kagaku Sōsahan | TBS | Episode 1 |

=== Radio series ===
| Year | Title | Network | Notes |
|---|---|---|---|
| 2013 | Keiko Kojima no All Night Nippon Gold | NBS | |
| 2013 | Keiko Kojima to Mitz Mangrove no All Night Nippon Gold | NBS | |

=== As a TBS announcer ===
==== TV series ====
| Year | Title | Notes | Ref. |
|---|---|---|---|
| | Mansei Yoshimoto Honō | | |
| | Fresh! | | |
| 1997 | Ohayō Kujira | | |
| | Discovery of the World's Mysteries | | |
| | Masahiro Nakai no Kazoku Kaigi o Hirakou | | |
| 2002 | Kaifuku! Spa Spa Ningen-gaku | Left due to a maternity leave | |
| | News Front | | |
| | Mama-ana no Deji@Kan | | |
| 2004 | Jijihoudan | Left in October 2005 due to a maternity leave and returned in April 2006 | |
| 2010 | News Sunday Scope | | |

==== Radio series ====
| Year | Title | Notes | Ref. |
|---|---|---|---|
| 1997 | Takahiro Kojima no Zenkoku Karaoke Best 10 | | |
| 1998 | Battle Talk Radio Access | Navigator | |
| 2006 | Stream | | |
| 2006 | Hiroshi Kume Radio Nan desu Kedo | | |
| | Hikaru Ijūin Shin'ya no Bakadjikara | Irregular appearances | |
| 2007 | Hikaru Ijūin Nichiyōbi no Himitsu Kichi | Irregular assistant | |
| | Kentaro no Oishī Radio | | |
| | Rock Entertainment Toshihiko Takamizawa no Rock Ban | | |
| 2009 | Keiko Kojima Kira Kira | | |

=== Advertisements ===
| Year | Title | Notes |
|---|---|---|
| 2006 | Nihon Shihō Shien Center-hō Terrace | Radio advertisement |
| | Shu Arakida Hōritsu Jimusho | TBS Radio only |
| 2011 | Shakai Hoshō to Zei no Ittai Kaikaku ni Tsuite: Seifu Kōhō | |
