= Misato Ugaki =

Japanese freelance announcer, model, actress, and television personality

- 宇垣 美里
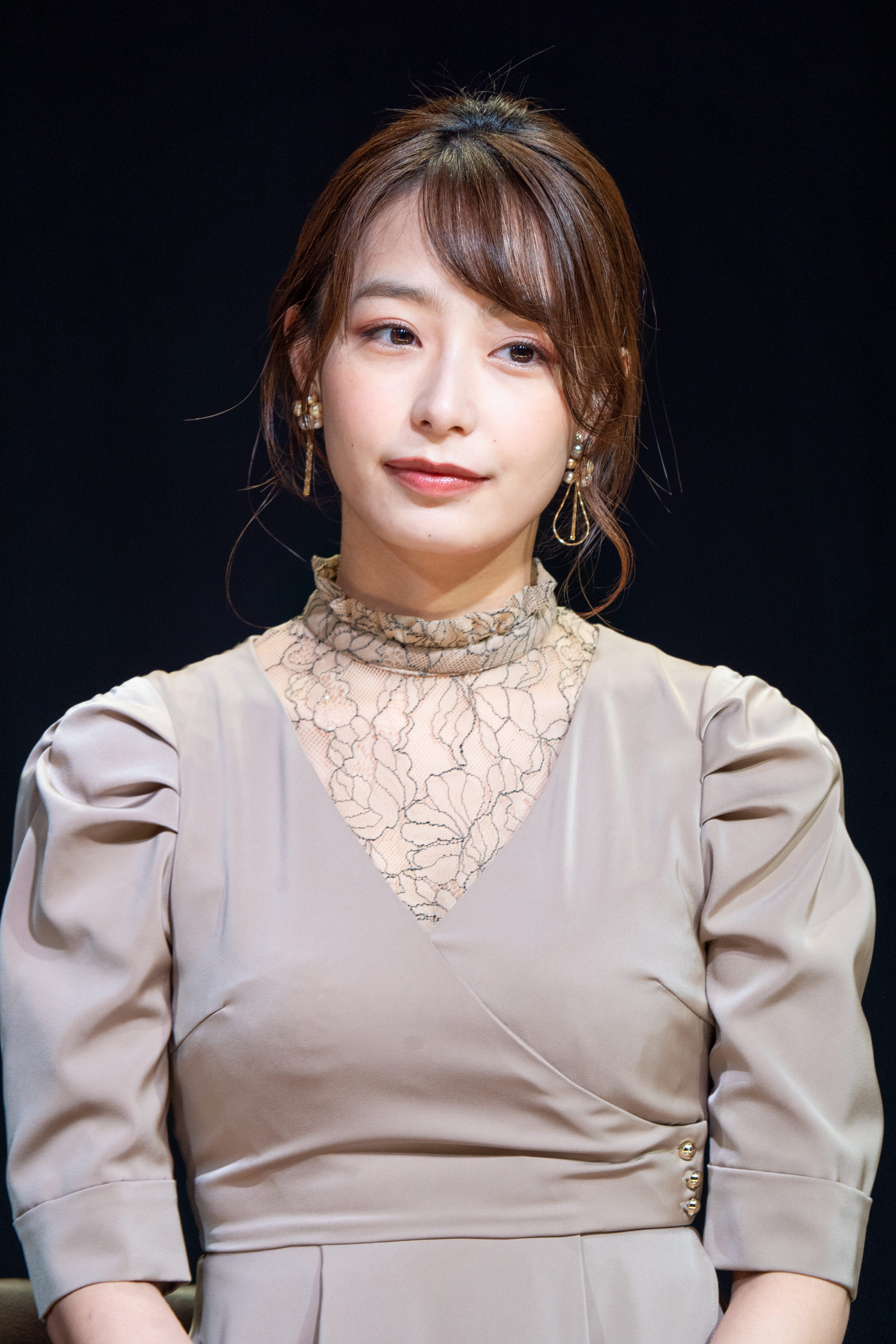
- Ugaki in September 2019
- Born: 16 April 1991 (age 35); Kobe, Hyōgo Prefecture, Japan
- Other name: Ugamisa (うがみさ)
- Education: Doshisha University Faculty of Policy Studies
- Occupations: Announcer; model; actress; television personality
- Years active: 2014–
- Employer: Oscar Promotion
- Television: Current; After 6 Junction; Former; Super Soccer J+; Morning Chance; Honoo-no Taiiku-kai TV; That Child doesn't Read Manga
- Website: Official website

Misato Ugaki (宇垣 美里, Ugaki Misato; born 16 April 1991) is a Japanese freelance announcer, model, actress, and television personality. Previously she was a Tokyo Broadcasting System Television announcer.

== Biography ==
She was born in Kobe, Hyōgo Prefecture.

After graduating from Hyogo Prefectural Nagata High School, she went to Doshisha University Faculty of Policy Studies. She specialised in international politics while studying at Doshisha University.

In 2011, she participated in the Miss Campus Doshisha and won the Grand Prix.

She joined Tokyo Broadcasting System Television in April 2014, and entered a training programme. During that time, in the Natsu Sacas 2014 Delicious Sacas: Bangumi Gourmet de Omotenashi held from 19 July to 31 August, along with Reina Minagawa and Ryota Shinoda who joined synchronised, she made an event PR as a "Delicious Sacas eat walking party."

From 29 September 2014, she started appearing in "Blitz Power Rush" (TBS Radio) as a replacement for Yumi Furuya, and started making appearances on television and other radio programmes.

She left TBS on 31 March 2019. On 1 April, she became a freelance announcer and she signed with Oscar Promotion.

== Currently appearances ==
Television

- Sakagami Shinobu no Katasete Agetai TV (Nippon TV, 23 Feb 2021 –)
- Kono Koi Ita Sugimashita (Nippon TV, 4 Aug 2022 –)

Radio

- After 6 Junction (TBS Radio, Tuesday regular, 3 Apr 2018 –)

== Former appearances, etc. ==
- MissCam.TV (Sun TV, January–March 2012)
  - Ugaki served as a reporter, among her co-stars was her senior of the Doshisha University policy department, Akita Asahi Broadcasting field caster revealed as Abe.
- Takuto Group television commercial 2012 ver. "Engi no ī Machi dokodesu ka" (Takuto Holdings)

=== Television ===
Regular or quasi-regular

- HayaChan! (6 October 2014 – 25 March 2015
- Morning Chance (6 October 2014 – 30 March 2018)
- N Suta (9 October 2014 – March 2015) – Every Thursday–Friday, in charge of "Nikkan Nakazuri News" and "N Ten"
- Super Soccer J+ (4 April 2015 – 1 April 2017)
  - The BS-TBS version was from 3 April 2015 - 24 March 2017, advanced broadcasting then terrestrial
- Honoo-no Taiiku-kai TV (11 April 2015 – 2016)
- Kakugari-kun!: Kakuritsu o Gariben shite Shiawaseninarō (20 July – 28 September 2015) – Progress
- Hiruobi! (Tuesdays, 3 April 2018 – 26 March 2019)
- That Child doesn't Read Manga (BS Nippon, 18 January 2020 – March 2022)

Single appearances, etc.

  - Once acted as substitute for Tomomi Ozaki, who was on vacation on 11 and 12 September 2014, and served as weather forecaster.
- Rediscover Japan (27 January 2015) – VTR corner, "Gaikoku Hito no Shuchō," progress
- All-Star Thanksgiving (April 2015, etc.) – Event plan reporter
- Sanma Akashiya no Geinōjin ka e Uta-ō Kettei-sen SP (26 April 2015) – Moderator with Sanma Akashiya
- JNN Sports&News (27 June 2015) – Caster
- Sekai no Kowai Yoru! (22 July, 26 December 2015, 30 March, 3 August 2016) – Moderator
- SKE48 Zero Position: Team Sparta! Nōryoku-betsu Under Battle (TBS Channel 1, October – December 2015) – Progress assistant for the SKE48 members' academic ability test planning. Appeared five times in all.
- Warai no Ōja ga Dai Shūketsu! Dream Tōzai Neta Gassen (1 January 2016, 1 January 2017, 1 January 2018) – Western Army Progression
- Guss and Academia (Nippon TV, 18 July 2019) – Guest
- Okawa / Ebisu's Journey Rose 2 Hours SP Bus Journey Autumn Team Shizuoka / Miho no Matsubara-Yamanashi / Kiyosato Local Bus Connection Trip (TV Tokyo, 18 July 2019) – Madonna
- Pro Yakyuu No. 1 Decisive Battle! Battle Stadium (Yomiuri TV, 4 January 2020) – MC
- Tonight is Tokoton "Yukio Mishima" (NHK BS Premium, 10 January 2021) – Guest

TV dramas

- Masshiro Episode 2 (20 January 2015)
- Cook Keibu no Bansan-kai Episode 3 (2 November 2016) – as new announcer
- She was Pretty (Kansai TV, 6 July – 14 September 2021) – as Erika Suda
- Tomorrow, I Will Be Someone's Girlfriend (2022) – as Ayana Nakatani
- Chaser Game (TV Tokyo, 9 September – 28 October 2022) – as Misono Kirisawa
- You Want To Be Fall in Love Me (MBS, 5 January – 16 February 2023) – as Kana Aizawa
- Jiyū na Megami: Backstage in New York (Fuji TV, 4 – 25 March 2023) – as Macaron
- 1122: For a Happy Marriage (Amazon Prime Video, June 2024) – as Yuri

=== Webcasts ===
- Sukiimo: Anime ga mitakunaru Jumon (8 April 2015 – 1 February 2017, TBS YouTube Official Channel; Wednesdays)
- Sick's Jonoshō: Naikaku Jōhō Chōsa-shitsu Tokumu Jikō Senjū-gakari Jiken-bo (Scheduled Apr 2018, Paravi) – as Peach Doctor, Momoko Ueda

=== Radio ===
- Blitz Power Rush (29 September 2014 – 31 March 2017)
- Yuji Matsuo Ashita e no Try (4 April – 19 September 2016) Mondays 19:30–20:00
- Drunk Dragon Suzuki Taku Taku (2 October 2016 – 25 September 2018)
- The Frogman Show A.I. Kyōzon Radio Kōkishin Kazoku (4 October 2017 – 29 March 2018) – Thursday assistant
- Yuri Sasagawa: Precious Sunday (3 September 2017, substitute during Yuri Sasagawa's summer holidays, 22 Apr 2018, substitute during Yuri Sasagawa's wedding reception preparation)
- Japan Realize presents Mariko Shinoda's Good Life Lab! (2 October 2018 – 30 June 2020)
- Misato Ugaki's Beautiful Ensemble (JOLF, 14 November 2020 – 27 March 2021)

=== Advertisements ===
- Video distribution service "Paravi" (2018, Premium Platform Japan)
- SmartNews
- Musee Platinum (2020)
