= Harry Sugiyama =

Japanese television personality and model (born 1985)

- ハリー 杉山
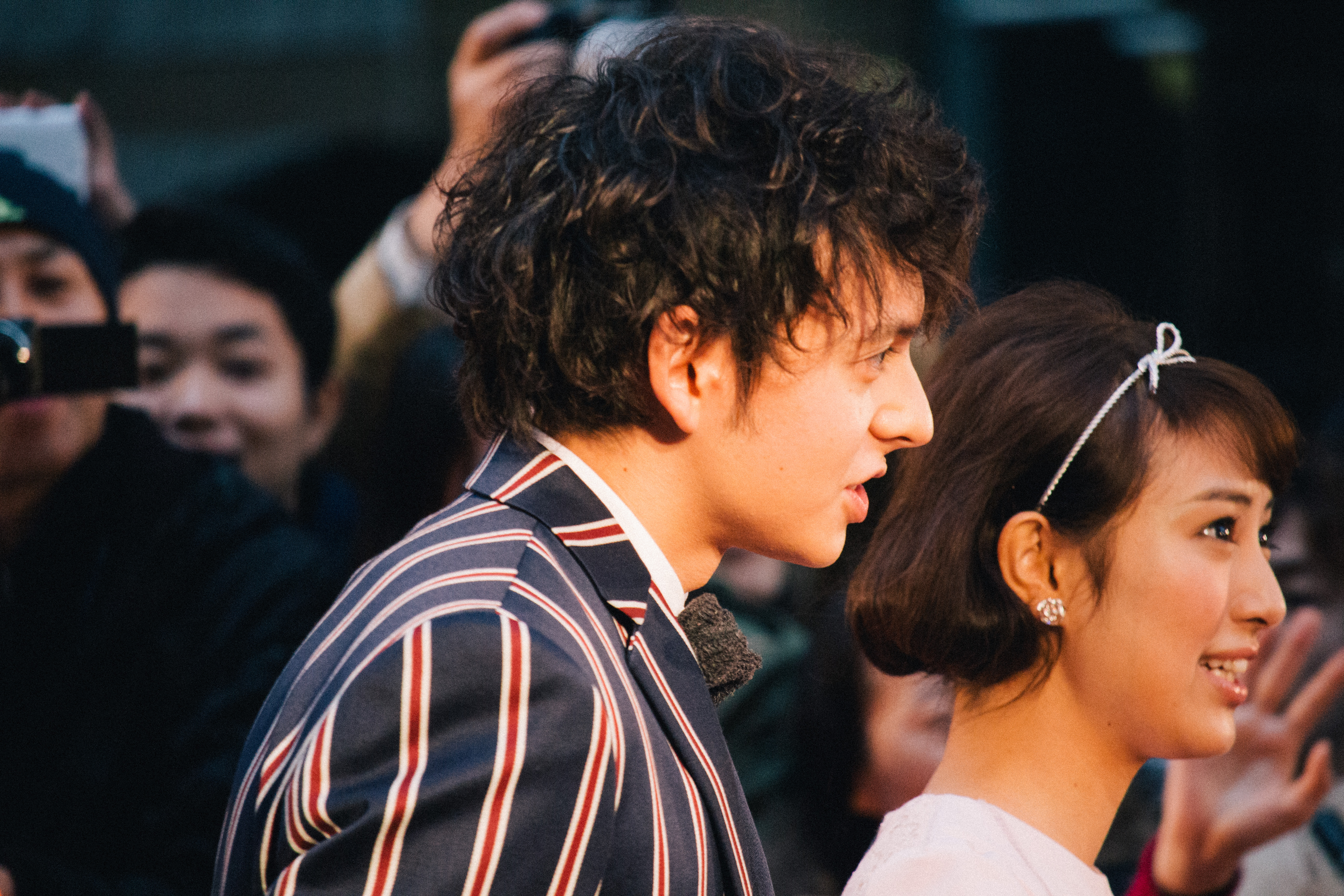
- Harry Sugiyama at the 27th Tokyo International Film Festival.
- Born: Henry Sugiyama Adrian Folliott Scott-Stokes; January 20, 1985 (age 41); Tokyo, Japan
- Other names: Harry Scott-Stokes, Henry Scott-Stokes Jr., 苏华明
- Education: Winchester College; University of London; Beijing Normal University
- Occupations: television personality, model
- Agent: TakeOff
- Height: 1.84 m (6 ft 0 in) (2007)
- Relatives: Henry Scott-Stokes (father); Akiko Sugiyama (mother)

Harry Sugiyama (ハリー 杉山, Harii Sugiyama; born January 20, 1985) is a Japanese television personality and model represented by TakeOff.

== Filmography ==
=== Film ===
Year	Title	Role	Notes	Ref.
2025	The Rightman			

=== Television drama ===
Year	Title	Role	Notes	Ref.
2019	Manpuku		Asadora	

=== Other television ===
Year	Title	Notes	Ref.
2018	Omotenashi no Kiso Eigo	Co-host of English language learning program	

== See also ==
- List of Japanese actors
