= Taijirō Amazawa =

Japanese poet and scholar (1936–2023)

- Born: 21 July 1936; Tokyo, Japan
- Died: 25 January 2023 (aged 86); Inage-ku, Chiba, Japan
- Education: University of Tokyo; University of Paris
- Occupations: Poet; Translator

Taijirō Amazawa (Japanese: 天沢 退二郎 Amazawa Taijirō; 21 July 1936 – 25 January 2023) was a Japanese poet, translator, and scholar.

== Biography ==
Born in Tokyo on 21 July 1936, Amazawa studied at the University of Tokyo alongside Shigehiko Hasumi. From 1964 to 1966, he continued his studies at the University of Paris before becoming a teacher of French medieval literature with a focus on the Holy Grail and King Arthur. He was also a translator of medieval poets, such as Chrétien de Troyes, Marie de France, Jean Renart, Rutebeuf, Adam de la Halle, Robert de Clari, Jean de Joinville, Philippe de Commines, Charles Perrault, Julien Gracq, and François Villon. He was the co-founder of the magazine Kyoku.

Amazawa gained notoriety in 1957 with a biography of the poet Kenji Miyazawa. He published collections of poetry in the 1960s and 1970s, with the latter turning towards prose poetry. In 1985, he was awarded the Jun Takami Award for Jigoku nite. In 2001, he was awarded the Yomiuri Prize in the poetry category and the Medal of Honor with Purple Ribbon for Yūmei gūrinka. In 2009, he became a member of the Japan Art Academy and was decorated with the Order of the Sacred Treasure the following year.

Amazawa died in Inage-ku on 25 January 2023, at the age of 86.
