= Honoo-no Taiiku-kai TV =

Japanese game show

- 炎の体育会TV
- Starring: Koji Imada; Ameagari Kesshitai
- Narrated by: Fumihiko Tachiki
- Country of origin: Japan
- Original language: Japanese

Production
- Production location: Japan
- Running time: Approximately 60 minutes

Original release
- Network: TBS
- Release: 10 October 2011 – present

Honoo-no Taiiku-kai TV (Japanese: 炎の体育会TV) is a Japanese gameshow where members of the public challenge sports professionals such as Ronda Rousey and Cris Cyborg.

== Cast ==
=== MC ===
- Koji Imada (今田 耕司, Imada Kōji)
- Ameagari Kesshitai

=== Assistant (TBS Announcer) ===
- Erina Masuda (枡田 絵理奈, Masuda Erina) October 2011 – March 2015
- Akiyo Yoshida (吉田 明世, Yoshida Akiyo)
- Misato Ugaki (宇垣 美里, Ugaki Misato) April 2015 – 2016

=== Play-to-play (Announcer) ===
- Keisuke Hatsuta (初田 啓介, Hatsuta Keisuke)
- Shōhei Fujimori (藤森 祥平, Fujimori Shōhei)
- Takashi Yano (矢野 武, Yano Takashi) (Freelance announcer)
