= Kinniku Banzuke =

Japanese television series

- Genre: Sports entertainment; Variety show; Game show
- Presented by: Ichirou Furutachi; Ryuuta Mine; Emily Nakayama
- Country of origin: Japan
- No. of seasons: 28
- No. of episodes: 267 + 20 Specials

Production
- Producer: Ushio Higuchi
- Running time: 56–60 minutes
- Production companies: TBS Sports; Dreamax; Monster9

Original release
- Network: TBS
- Release: July 8, 1995 – May 4, 2002

Related
- Sasuke; Body (TV series); Sasuke Mania; Viking: The Ultimate Obstacle Course; Taiiku no Jikan (Physical Education Time)

Kinniku Banzuke (Japanese: 筋肉番付; lit. 'Ranked List of Muscle'), known internationally as Unbeatable Banzuke, is a Japanese television program, that aired weekly as the premier sports entertainment variety show of TBS. Originally a spinoff of Pro Sportsman No.1, it evolved into its own series which has continued to see spinoffs and installments for more than three decades. Several seasonal specials were also made, such as Sasuke, which would become a worldwide franchise in its own right.

Through various games based on varying disciplines of sports, professional players and general participants challenged the limits of physical strength and technique, winning prizes if all challenges were successfully destroyed. The popularity of the displays of amazing physical strength and technique by professional players and luck of general participants drove TV Asahi to move its anime time slot up one hour and caused the cancellation of Heisei Kyouikuiinkai (平成教育委員会, Heisei Board of Education) on Fuji TV.

The use of the program's mascot, Kongō-kun (金剛くん, Adamantium Boy), originally only featured during the broadcast, expanded in 1996 into the program's opening sequence and every game's introduction. Later on, he appeared in a wide variety of merchandise including Anime, Manga, Video games, Action figures, Trading cards and Board games.

== History ==
=== 1993–1995: origins, Sportsman No.1 and the early years of Kinniku Banzuke ===
Release timeline Main series entries in bold Original TBS series in red Monster9 breakaway series in green Modern TBS series in blue Years with specials but no main series in yellow Colors are based on the studio logos at the time
1993	Sportsman No.1 (1993-2010)
1994
1995	**Kinniku Banzuke** (1995-2002)
1996
1997
1998
1999
2000	Muscle Elite (2000-2001)
2001
2002	Sasuke (2002-present)
2002	**Taiiku World** (2002-2003)
2003	Kunoichi (2003-present)
2003	**Golden Muscle** (2003-2004)
2004	**Ougon Kinniku**
2005	**Dream Games No.1**
2005	Viking (2005-2006)
2006
2007	**Sports ⨉ Casino**
2007	**Taiiku Time** (2007-2008)
2008
2009	**3Minutes**
2010
2011	**Taiiku Kai TV** (2011-2024)
2012	Sports Danshi Grand Prix (2012-present)
2013
2014
2015
2016
2017
2018
2019
2020
2021
2022
2023
2024	Kasso (2024-present)
2024	All Star Taiikusai
2025	Hundred Samurai; Hanzo
2026	Musou

Through the 1980s, TBS dominated the television scene for competition series with Takeshi's Castle, which ended in 1990 related to fallout from the Japanese asset price bubble. Through the early 1990s, sports broadcasting director Ushio Higuchi began planning a new original sports competition for TBS, which launched as a Television special on December 29, 1993 with the help of prolific sports commentator Ichiro Furutachi. The series, Sportsman No.1, featured athletes attempting a custom Heptathlon-style tournament where competitors from several different sporting disciplines competed against each other to determine who was the true King of Sports. Events covered a wide variety of general athletics including Sprinting, Push-ups, Vaulting, Tug of war, Beach Flags, Rope climbing and Obstacle Racing, with scores based on performance. The best overall competitor would be declared the winner.

While the initial broadcast received mediocre viewership, a second tournament featuring a fully refreshed Greco-Roman theming was broadcast on January 1, 1995 to critical acclaim. A third tournament was immediately fast-tracked, receiving an official sponsorship from the Japanese Olympic Committee, and once again was a hit broadcast.

TBS began to receive a wave of wannabe athletes contacting their phone lines asking, if they could be considered for upcoming Sportsman No.1 tournaments. The idea was initially rejected, as Higuchi wanted to maintain a certain level of athletic prestige to be a requirement to compete on Sportsman No.1, however TBS eventually made the decision to create a spinoff series that would allow the general public to compete. Due to the scope of inquires, production decided that rather than hosting a central tournament like Sportsman No.1, they would host preliminary qualification rounds all throughout Japan, with the best of each region advancing to a final round filmed at Midoriyama Studios in Yokohama.

A pilot season of Kinniku Banzuke began airing at 1:15am JST on July 8, 1995 as a series of eleven 30 minute pilot episodes. TBS believed that it would be an ideal late night program, as it would be a niche program targeting adult men already interested in athletics. These episodes saw Sit-ups, Push-ups, and Vaulting return from Sportsman, with tryouts in Tohoku, Kansai, Okinawa, Hokuriku, Hokkaido and Kyushu.

The series became an unprecedented hit, with record high viewership despite the late broadcast time. This was attributed to several factors; family and friends of competitors tuned in to cheer them on, women tuned in due to the Odagiri effect, and large numbers of youth found the show fun and aspired to compete. TBS immediately pivoted their approach and moved the series to a prime time window on Saturday at 19:00 JST beginning in October 1995.

Following the move to primetime, Kinniku Banzuke continued to broadcast an expanded number of events returning from Sportsman such as Beach Flags, and created additional competition divisions for women and youth. They also invested in new events, most notably a Backflip racing event named Bakuten that attracted success from professional gymnasts such as Yukio Iketani. During this first season, the fourth episode reached an unprecedented 31.9% viewership rating during Belarusian Olympic gymnast Vitaly Scherbo's attempt at Bakuten.

=== 1996–1999: main format and the "9" Systems ===
In the Spring of 1996, as a response to decreasing ratings, as well as competing series like Ucchan Nanchan no Honô no Challenger, Higuchi decided to branch the series out to include two new categories of events.

The first were variations of target practice under different sports disciplines such as Baseball and Soccer, which allowed an influx of professional athletes to compete due to the lowered risk. This category had initially been conceived during the development of Sportsman No. 1 but had been scrapped, with the idea being based on warm-up exercises that Higuchi had witness Pitcher's perform before professional baseball games. The debut events were Struck Out and Kick Target, representing Baseball and Soccer. These events used a format called the 9 Panel or Struck Out system. In this system, competitors would get 12 attempts to hit 9 target panels from a specified distance. While it was possible to knock out multiple targets in one throw, a competitor was immediately eliminated if their number of remaining attempts dropped below the number of target remaining.

The second category were skill-based obstacles courses that featured 9 obstacles, called the 9 Area system. Higuchi's initial concept for this was a course inspired by Bakuten that featured athletes navigating different areas such as stairs, parallel bars and ramps while in a handstand. Originally developed under the name "Handstand Jungle", the event debuted in May 1996 as Hand Walk. Competitors had to navigate an entire course without ever breaking out of their handstand, with the sole exception being during the designated break zone halfway through the course, where they might rest for 30 seconds.

All of these events were critical successes, and Higuchi immediately expanded the roster of events. For courses, Higuchi expanded this obstacle course idea into several other disciplines; Super Rider for bike trials, Like a Pierrot for Unicycle, Kangaroo for pogo stick and Bamboo Derby for stilt walking. For panel events, Higuchi introduced Punch Out for Bowling, Service Ace for Tennis, 9Hoops for Basketball, among others. As expected, these events were similar popular, and so Higuchi began to expand into original course ideas, such as Sponge Bridge, a precision balance course, and Spider Walk, an event based on the Ninja skill of moving while perched between two walls, as was historically done to move stealthily between two buildings in an alley. This expansion culminated in the creation of Sasuke, which would become a global phenomenon under the name Ninja Warrior.

The original courses Higuchi had designed such as Hand Walk were beginning to be defeated after several filming sessions. Each film session contained 32 attempts, and after filming the staff would assess next steps. If undefeated, they would begin to plan adjustments if the course is too hard. If beaten, they decided to employ recursive self-improvement in courses, where events would return with an increasing number in their title, featuring renewed and more difficult obstacles to keep competitors indefinitely returning to events. Hand Walk returned as Hand Walk II later in 1996 setting the trend for returning events, which would go on to be a staple of the series' appeal.

Over the course of Kinniku Banzuke and its parent series Sportsman No.1, had a number of breakout competitors who featured recurring strong performances emerged, including Kane Kosugi, Katsumi Yamada and Akira Omori. The series began incorporating behind-the-scenes documentary segments showing their personal lives, how they trained, and their celebrity pursuits. These segments would continue to drive the series success forward by establishing a De facto recurring cast for a show that otherwise featured new competitors each week. This would be pushed further with Quick Muscle champion Kazuhiko Akiyama becoming the first competitor to win Sasuke.

=== 1999–2002: renewed success and expansion ===
Entering the new millennium, Kinniku Banzuke began increasing its budget and lineup. Events such as Hand Walk IV, Super Rider V, A Craftsman, Super Helico II and Like a Pierrot Ghost sported a significant visual upgrade into themed courses. New large-scale events were created to expand the core lineup, including Escape, Kunoichi and Super Dog. On top of this, TBS began to broaden the franchise with a lineup of multimedia projects, such as an ongoing video game series produced by Konami.

On the air, TBS launched its first ever spinoff of Kinniku Banzuke, under the title Kinniku Seiei: Muscle Elite, which featured a return of the Sportsman themed public trials seen in the first year of Kinniku Banzuke, aired weekly after midnight. The series was hosted by Kane Kosugi and featured additional behind the scenes content for the series. This was followed up with Kinniku Angya in 2001, which had Kane Kosugi touring Japan to visit professional athletes for Ad hoc challenges. During Kinniku Angya, celebrity Shoei introduced a new segment known as Muscle Musical, where a troupe of celebrities formatted an acrobatic troupe for stage shows. Muscle Musical would prove wildly successful, and would move its segments over to the main Kinniku Banzuke broadcasts. A third spinoff series, Kane the Muscle, would continue the focus on Kane Kosugi, featuring dedicate episodes on his life and training. Behind the scenes, Ushio Higuchi decided to produce an original feature-length film starring Kane Kosugi, and featuring references and ideas taken from Kinniku Banzuke. The film would have behind the scenes looks during broadcasts, and released worldwide in 2002 as Muscle Heat. A fourth spinoff, Tōkon Kinniku: MUSCLE-ISM debuted in April 2002, focusing on martial arts competitors.

=== 2002: Chikarajima and hiatus ===
On May 5, 2002, two show participants injured their cervical vertebrae during the filming of an episode entitled "Chikarajima" ("Power Island"), an obstacle course with a temple-like setting stationed outside. The accidents occurred during the "Rock Attack" and "Rock Valley" obstacle portions, both of which involve a giant ball weighing approximately 30 kilograms and having a diameter of 1.8 meters.

In Rock Attack, the contestant must catch the ball as it rolls down a 15-degree slope, then push it back up and onto a platform at the top. For Rock Valley, the contestant must climb onto the ball and walk it across a waterway 2.5 meters wide and 1.4 meters deep. Wei Tao, a 19-year-old Chinese freshman at Kyoto University, fell into the waterway; Takunori Isa, a 20-year-old junior at Tokai University, was knocked down and rolled over by the ball while trying to catch it. It was later revealed that at least two other contestants suffered spinal injuries while participating on the show as well. College student Takahiro Saito, 19, was hospitalized after falling more than six feet into a four-foot-deep water-filled moat, while another contestant was hospitalized after trying to catch a 100-pound plastic ball, nearly six feet in diameter. While most injuries were minor, Isa's injury proved to be a Paralyzing break, however he used the incident as a positive motivating factor, starting a company that produced workout equipment for individuals with Paraplegia and other physical disabilities.

The May 5, 2002 episode would prove to be the final episode of Kinniku Banzuke. Show production was officially put on hiatus, and the show was effectively cancelled. The dormant space was filled with a special edition of Count Down TV, CDTV Gold, entitled Za! Gekitou! Daikazoku!! (ザ!激闘!大家族!!; The! Intensely Fighting! Large Family!!). On May 24, 2002, the Japan Industrial Safety & Health Association announced that their audit revealed that many of the show's events would need to be cancelled or modified for the show to continue safely. TBS responded saying that they would relaunch the show in the future, complying with their assessments.

Despite the main series suspension, Tōkon Kinniku continued to air weekly without pause, incorporating Muscle Musical segments in as well. Due to the uncertainty with Kinniku Banzuke, TBS made the decision to split Sasuke off and debut it as its own show in September 2002, with promotional content airing during episodes of Tōkon Kinniku.

=== 2002–2003: Relaunch as Taiiku World and Dreamax takeover ===
In October 2002, after five months off-air, Kinniku Banzuke relaunched under the title Taiiku World. TBS made the decision to rebrand, to try and continue to have viewers return, while creating separation from the bad press surrounding Kinniku Banzuke's end. Lead host Ichiro Furutachi reprised his role as lead host, supported by new assistants RIKACO, Toshiki Kashu, Aya Hirayama, Gori, Hiroki Kawada and Masaru Nagai. Taiiku World's first season launched with a mix of new and returning events. Panel events such as Struck Out, Kick Target, Spray Hitter, Balloon Shooter and Hustler returned more or less untouched, only with minor changes to their frames and layouts. The lineup was supplemented by new panel events in the form of Million Catch, Striker King, and Super Freekick, and new course events Monkey Bars and Dizzy Bridge. In addition, two brand new formats were introduced. Brutal Labo saw competitors take on several individual Sportsman style challenges for place on an overall leaderboard. Artistic Performer featured a talent competition, with prizes based on the number of judges who voted for them. Kunoichi would once again return as an event within Taiiku World. In the end, this season saw comparable ratings to Kinniku Banzuke prior to cancellation, and so it was renewed with additional funding. Its second and third seasons saw the return of Super Dog, Super Rider, Neko de Drive, Punch Out, Hand Walk, and Sasuke Junior, with series high budgets and production values.

Alongside Taiiku World, two additional series were produced. Cyborg Damashī saw idol Yuko Mizuno train for MMA under the guidance of Hitoshi Matsumoto, while Yoru no Taiiku saw Yuko Mizuno and Bob Sapp continue the martial arts trends of Tōkon Kinniku and Cyborg Damashī with a martial arts docuseries.

In July 2003, TBS performed corporate restructuring and decided that Ushio Higuchi and the TBS Sports team would be relocated to newly acquired subsidiary Dreamax TV. Production of Taiiku World was immediately suspended, with the fourth season consisting almost entirely of outtakes, reruns, behind the scenes content and promotion of other series. TBS decided that Kunoichi would follow Sasuke's lead and be spun off into an independent series in September 2003.

=== 2003–2005: Golden Muscle and Dream Games ===
Following the dissolution of Taiiku World, series lead Ichiro Furutachi would leave TBS to focus on other projects. TBS would announce that a new project, Ougon Kinniku (lit. Golden Muscle), would begin airing in October 2003 and would continue Yoru no Taiiku, once again starring Yuko Mizuno, alongside Hideaki Takizawa and Jay Kabira, with regular appearances by Bob Sapp. Despite the entire first season having been filmed, at some point prior to broadcast, TBS decided to shift the series to continue Kinniku Banzuke, shelving the initial footage and fast-tracking new segments featuring Sasuke, Hand Walk, Struck Out, Kick Target, Balloon Shooter, Daruma and Spray Hitter for its debut season. This new season launched under the title Golden Muscle in English, but retained similar branding, logos, staff and website from the initial concept.

Following series low ratings, Golden Muscle's second season broadcast with a noticeably reduced budget, with Punch Out, Super Rider, 9Hoops, Service Ace and Attack airing alongside a single new event, Quickdraw. This season had slightly increased ratings, but not enough to save the series. This iteration of Golden Muscle was cancelled, being replaced with the original Ougon Kinniku footage intermixed with new commentary. This footage was aired late on Wednesday evenings over Spring 2004, showing off martial arts footage, Muscle Musical, and a new Sasuke spinoff specifically for Sumo competitors. After one season, the second iteration of Golden Muscle concluded.

In February 2005, Higuchi and TBS launched Kinniku Ōkoku: Dream Games No.1 as the first in a series of specials. Due to low ratings, only one episode was ever produced, and shortly after filming, Ushio Higuchi would leave Dreamax to form his own studio, Monster9.

=== 2005–2011: Monster9 era ===
Spring 2005 would see the launch of Monster9's first three new Banzuke projects.

BODY was a spinoff docuseries focusing on the competitors of Sportsman No.1, Sasuke and Kunoichi, including both behind-the-scenes content, alongside new competitors and qualification rounds for each series. The series was renewed as Sasuke Maniac in 2006 broadcasting for a combined 14 seasons. During this time period, Ushio Higuchi opened a series of Banzuke theme parks called Muscle Park, which he promoted through a new series called Muscle Channel, which featured celebrities competing in classic Banzuke events at Muscle Park.

Viking was a variant of Sasuke featuring a mix of the classic format, while incorporating other Kinniku Banzuke events such as Ottoto 9, Amazing Road, Bamboo Derby, Body Clock and Brain Panic. Umi Kinniku-Oh focused on Muscle Musical, while also containing qualification rounds for Viking, and the return of Hand Walk, Quick Muscle, Struck Out, and Kick Target. Both series caused a stir after being broadcast on TBS' main broadcasting competitor, FujiTV. A 3rd FujiTV project, Family Muscle, aired as two specials in 2006. All 3 series would end following a falling out and subsequent legal case between Monster9 and FujiTV, who claimed mismanagement and under-delivery.

Following his firing from FujiTV, Higuchi would launch a more traditional reboot of Kinniku Banzuke as a pilot series during TV Asahi's experimental programming block Super Quiz, under the title Spo★Kaji (Sports ⨉ Casino). After 7 episodes, TV Asahi announced that the series would receive a full ongoing serialization under the title Taiiku no Jikan (Taiiku Time), which broadcast for two seasons. During the same time, Higuchi was negotiating contracts with a fourth network, Tokyo MX. Monster9 would launch the series Muscle World on Tokyo MX in Spring 2008, featuring Muscle Musical as the leads, as they took on several classic Banzuke challenges. During the course of the TV Asahi and Tokyo MX series, Higuchi would encounter legal disputes over unfair work habits from Muscle Musical members, which he would ultimately lose. This controversy would lead to significant financial losses and production difficulties, which contributed to the series at both network ending.

In March 2009, Higuchi would once again return to TBS, producing the series 3Minutes as a relaunch of Kinniku Banzuke, featuring a series of challenges with a 3-minute time limit. The premiere episode debuted against Quiz! Hexagon II, leading to extremely poor ratings. This, combined with extremely cheap production values, lack of returning content and unpopular debut events led to the series being cancelled immediately, despite having many episodes already filmed.

A greatest hits compilation of the best moments through all previous installments of Banzuke broadcast in 2010 as part of the series finale of Sportsman No.1.

Ongoing financial difficulties paired with controversy, lack on new programs and ongoing legal disputes for workplace conditions would eventually lead to Monster9 declaring bankruptcy in 2011. The assets and IP would be sold and dispersed, with many going back to TBS. Kinniku Banzuke and Sportsman No.1 would retain under Higuchi's ownership, forcing TBS to rebrand their content, and leading to over a decade of ongoing legal dispute between Higuchi and TBS.

=== 2011–2023: Taiiku Kai, Kyokugen and reboots ===
During Kinniku Banzuke's original run a series of three crossover specials between Kinniku Banzuke and Johnny & Associates called Taiiku Kai, featuring popular male celebrities taking on the events of Sportsman No.1 and Kinniku Banzuke. A fourth special aired in 2005, focusing on the achievements of women in the 2004 Summer Olympics. In 2011, a fifth special was produced combining the concepts of the previous installments: male celebrities would duel female professional athletes in the field of expertise such as Golf, Keirin, Swimming and Martial arts. It additionally featured a new variant of Attack, where a team of celebrities had to hit targets in Volleyball, with a team of professional female volleyball players on defense.

Following Monster9's bankruptcy, TBS immediately began looking into continuations of its series with Sportsman No.1 was rebooted as Sports Danshi Grand Prix and Sasuke rebooted as Sasuke Rising. TBS would merge the contents of the Kinniku Banzuke series into Taiiku Kai in order to bring it closer to its roots. Taiiku Kai would almost entirely focus on the panel events, with only debut course Million Spoon appearing for courses. With each consecutive year, increased focus on Banzuke panels events occurred. In addition to these events, Taiiku Kai would often feature tournaments where a professional athlete or team would take on a series of unique, custom challenges (usually called Topping Challenges) for a chance to win luxury food, donations for charity or simply for fun.

From 2012 until 2017, a six-hour special was broadcast on New Year's Eve under the title Kyokugen, featuring special variants of Taiiku Kai events. Kyokugen events were recorded year round as side events during filming sessions of Taiiku Kai, with footage being used interchangeably on occasion. During 2014, a series of specials under the title Bunka-kei were broadcasting, keeping Taiiku Kai's format, but focusing on intellectual challenges. In 2015, a pilot episode for a course-centric reboot of Banzuke was broadcast and featured Neko de Drive, Born Connection and Seesaw 60, however it was not picked up and ended after a single episode.

In 2017, Taiiku Kai performed a series wide revision to the panel events for the first time in over twenty years. Rather than the normal format of having 12 attempts to hit 9 panels, competitors would have unlimited attempts under a 100-second time limit to hit between 15 and 31 targets (depending on sport). These 100 second challenges would appear in nearly episode from 2017 until the outbreak of the COVID-19 pandemic, with variations for fourteen different sports. They would once again remix the format in 2020 by debuting the moving target format, where competitors had unlimited attempts and no time limit, however 20 targets would move on a conveyor belt and would not be accessible once gone.

Due to a decline in ratings, Fuwa-chan's controversy and subsequent hiatus, and the Johnny Kitagawa sexual abuse scandal, Taiiku Kai ended its ongoing serialization in March 2023. By that time, four additional specials aired.

=== 2024–present: Kasso, Hanzo, Musou and global expansion ===
For the first time in 13 years, no ongoing Banzuke series was broadcasting. In March 2024, a revival of the Kinniku Banzuke event Skeboarder broadcast under the title Kasso. It debuted to low viewership in Japan, and pressure from production following a record setting five winners in its first filming session - an all-time series record. While the series was initially put on hold, a compilation was posted on YouTube with English subtitles which garnered viral international attention, netting more than 10 million views. The series was immediately greenlit to return. A second tournament also resonated around the world. Kasso's first overseas event, titled Kasso Fest: Skate and Sound, gained immense popularity globally.

On New Year's Eve 2024, a crossover special entitled All Star Taiikusai aired, containing events from Kinniku Banzuke, Sports Danshi Grand Prix, Sasuke, All-Star Thanksgiving, and Tokyo Friend Park 2. 9Hoops II and Quick Muscle returned from Kinniku Banzuke. In March 2025, a new series titled Hundred Samurai co-produced by SpringHill Company debuted, the first internationally co-produced episode, making a tournament out of three Basketball events returning from Taiiku Kai. Both Hundred Samurai and Kasso are currently in talks for international adaptations.

In March 2025, TBS suddenly announced Hanzo, which was a spin-off of Sasuke that took the existing Survival Attack format and made adjustments to bring it more into alignment with the debut of Obstacle course racing as a discipline within the Modern Pentathlon at the 2028 Summer Olympics.

In March 2026. TBS suddenly announced Musou, which was a sport gameshow that mixed the format of Sasuke, Kunoichi and other TBS sport gameshows such as Takeshi's Castle, Sports Danshi Grand Prix, DOORS and Tokyo Friend Park.

== Series overview ==
Broadcasts are split into four eras:

- The Classic Era ran from the series inception in 1993 until the formation of Monster9 in February 2005
- The Monster9 Era ran from its content launch in March 2005 until its collapse over 2009 thru 2011.
- The Reboot Era covers TBS series produced alongside Taiiku Kai between January 2011 and March 2023, primarily including series reboots such as Taiiku Kai, Sasuke, Kunoichi, and Sports Danshi Grand Prix
- The Modern Era covers all specials created after Taiiku Kai's end of weekly serialization in March 2023.

Below are a list of all of the core, main series installments in the Kinniku Banzuke series. This list only includes series that received an ongoing serialization on network television.

=== Regular seasons ===
Era	Series			Seasons	Episodes	Specials	Network	Broadcast Dates	
Era	Original title	Romanized Title	Official English Title	Seasons	Episodes	Specials	Network	First released	Last released
Classic Era	筋肉番付	Kinniku Banzuke	Muscle Ranking (1995–2002); Unbeatable Banzuke (2007–)	Pilot	11	—	TBS	7 July 1995	16 September 1995
Classic Era	筋肉番付	Kinniku Banzuke	Muscle Ranking (1995–2002); Unbeatable Banzuke (2007–)	27	256	17	TBS	14 October 1995	4 May 2002
Classic Era	体育王国	Taiiku Ōkoku	Taiiku World	4	37	1	TBS	12 October 2002	13 September 2003
Classic Era	ゴールドマッスル	Golden Muscle	Golden Muscle	2	16	3	TBS	15 October 2003	24 March 2004
Classic Era	黄金筋肉	Ougon Kinniku	Golden Muscle	1	12	—	TBS	13 April 2004	2 June 2004
Monster9 Era	スポ★カジ	Spo★Kaji	Sports ⨉ Casino	2	6	1	TV Asahi	13 June 2007	26 September 2007
Monster9 Era	体育の時間	Taiiku no Jikan	Taiiku Time	2	14	2	TV Asahi	23 October 2007	26 February 2008
Monster9 Era	3ミニッツ	3Minutes		1	—	1	TBS	4 March 2009	
Reboot Era	炎の体育会	Honō no Taiiku Kai	Athletic Fire	45	271	6	TBS	11 January 2011	16 November 2024
Total				85 seasons	623 episodes	31 specials			

=== Specials ===
Below is a list of special broadcasts. These specials release independently from any of the above ongoing series.

Era	Series			Seasons	Episodes	Network	Broadcast Dates	
Era	Original title	Romanized title	Official English Title	Seasons	Episodes	Network	First released	Last released
Classic Era	スポーツマンNo.1決定戦	Sportsman No.1 Ketteisen	Muscular Athletic Championship	39		TBS	29 December 1993	7 January 2010
Classic Era	炎の体育会No.1 決定戦	Honō no Taiiku Kai No.1 Ketteisen	Taiiku Kai No.1	3		TBS	13 October 2000	22 October 2002
Classic Era	サスケ	Sasuke	Ninja Warrior	43		TBS	25 September 2002	Ongoing —
Classic Era	くノー	Kunoichi	Women of Ninja Warrior	13		TBS	24 September 2003	Ongoing —
Classic Era	筋肉王国	Kinniku Ōkoku	Dream Games No.1	1		TBS	15 February 2005	
Monster9 Era	海筋肉王～バイキング～	Umi Kinniku-O ～Viking～	Viking: The Ultimate Obstacle Course	7		FujiTV	22 March 2005	3 October 2006
Monster9 Era	ファミ筋	Fami Kinniku	Family Muscle	2		FujiTV	21 March 2006	28 March 2006
Reboot Era	極限	Kyokugen		8		TBS	31 December 2012	31 December 2017
Reboot Era	最強スポーツ男子頂上決戦	Saikyō Sports Danshi Chōjō Kessen	Sports Danshi Grand Prix	14		TBS	12 November 2012	Ongoing —
Reboot Era	魂の文化系	Tamashī no Bunka Kei	Bunka-kei	1	2	TBS	21 June 2014	5 November 2014
Reboot Era	愛のバトランド	Ai no Battleland	Love Battleland	1		TBS	20 June 2015	
Modern Era	KASSO			3	6	TBS	18 March 2024	Ongoing —
Modern Era	オールスター体育祭	All Star Taiikusai		1		TBS	31 December 2024	Ongoing —
Modern Era	百武将	Momotake Susumu	Hundred Samurai	1	2	TBS	17 March 2025	Ongoing —
Modern Era	HANZO			1	1	TBS	24 March 2025	24 March 2025
Modern Era	MUSOU無双	MUSOU		1	1	TBS	23 March 2026	Ongoing —
Total				128 specials	133 episodes			

=== Spinoffs ===
Below are a list of spinoff in the Kinniku Banzuke series. The majority focus on content other than athletics challenges such as documentary content.

Era	Series			Seasons	Episodes	Network	Broadcast Dates	
Era	Original title	Romanized title	Official English Title	Seasons	Episodes	Network	First released	Last released
Classic Era	筋肉精鋭	Kinniku Seiei	Muscle Elite	4	44	TBS	5 April 2000	28 February 2001
Classic Era	筋肉行脚	Kinniku Angya	Muscle Tour	2	25	TBS	4 April 2001	26 September 2001
Classic Era	ケイン・ザ・マッスル	Kane the Muscle		2	19	TBS	3 October 2001	27 March 2002
Classic Era	闘魂筋肉	Tōkon Kinniku	MUSCLE-ISM	2	23	TBS	3 April 2002	25 September 2002
Classic Era	サイボーグ魂	Cyborg Damashī	Cyborg Soul	2	24	TBS	1 October 2002	25 March 2003
Classic Era	夜の体育	Taiiku no Yoru	Night Taiiku	2	22	TBS	7 April 2003	22 September 2003
Monster9 Era	海筋肉王	Umi Kinniku-O	Sea Muscle King	8	70	FujiTV	3 April 2005	25 March 2007
Monster9 Era	BODY			5	59	TBS	3 April 2005	28 June 2006
Monster9 Era	サスケマニア	Sasuke Maniac		9	108	TBS	2 July 2006	28 September 2008
Monster9 Era	マッスルch	Muscle ch	Muscle Channel	2	20	BS-i	19 April 2007	13 September 2007
Monster9 Era	マッスルワールド	Muscle World		4	53	Tokyo MX	5 April 2008	28 March 2009
Total				42 seasons	467 episodes			

=== Pseudo-canon series ===
These series are created by the original staff of Kinniku Banzuke and feature direct crossover in events, however they were produced as side projects outside of the main series and are as a result not considered canon, despite the similarity and often confusing fans.

Era	Series			Seasons	Episodes	Network	Broadcast Dates	
Era	Original title	Romanized title	Official English Title	Seasons	Episodes	Network	First released	Last released
Monster9 Era	ウルトラ・ストロング・ゲーム	Ultra Strong Game		—	1	Nippon TV	3 March 2005	
Monster9 Era	DOORS			—	6	TBS	19 September 2005	28 December 2009
Monster9 Era	世紀のスポーツ大作戦TARA-REBA	Seiki no Sports Dai Sakusen Tara-Reba	What If?	—	1	TBS	29 December 2005	
Monster9 Era	史上最大スポーツ大感謝祭	Shijō Saidai Sports Dai Kanshasai	Athlete Thanksgiving Festival	—	1	TBS	23 September 2007	
Reboot Era	DEKITA			—	1	TBS	7 October 2012	
Reboot Era	GENKAICHI			—	1	TBS	10 October 2012	
Reboot Era	究極バトル“ゼウス”	Kyūkyoku Battle “Zeus”	Ultimate Battlefield of "Zeus"	—	3	TBS	9 April 2015	24 November 2016
Reboot Era	究極のヒーローはKuroOvi選手権	Kyūkyoku no Hero wa KuroOvi Senshuken	KuroOvi: The Ultimate Hero	3	179	Family Gekijo / YouTube	27 December 2017	8 October 2018

== List of events ==
=== Obstacle Course Events ===
These events featured obstacle courses, typically based on Ushio Higuchi's 9 Area System. Each event was themed to a specific sporting discipline, and typically had 9, or in some cases 18, obstacles to defeat. In many global regions including on G4 in North American, these were the main events broadcast and are the most known and most popular.

Discipline	Event		First Seen On		Broadcast Region		
Discipline	English name	Variant	Series	Start date	Japan	Asia	Global
Balance beam, Hurdles	Amazing Road		KB	13 October 2001	check	check	check
Stilt walking	Bamboo Derby	Bamboo Derby	KB	1996	check	check	check
Stilt walking	Bamboo Derby	Bamboo Derby II	KB	1997	check	check	check
Stilt walking	Bamboo Derby	Bamboo Derby III	KB	1997	check	check	check
Kinjiro	Born Connection		KB	13 October 2001	check	check	X mark
Bungee	Cannot Fly		KB	Unaired	X mark	X mark	X mark
Bouldering	Chimpan Climb		TT	6 November 2007	check	X mark	X mark
Dizzy bat, Balance beam	Dizzy Bridge		TW	12 October 2002	check	X mark	X mark
Survival Attack	Escape		KB	1 July 2000	check	check	X mark
Survival Attack	Family Muscle		FM	21 March 2006	check	X mark	X mark
Soccer	Game Maker	Game Maker	KB	1998	check	check	X mark
Soccer	Game Maker	Fantasista	KB	17 November 2001	check	check	X mark
Soccer	Game Maker	Striker King	TW	26 October 2002	check	X mark	X mark
Labyrinth	Giant Ball		KB	1997	check	check	check
Handstand	Hand Walk	Hand Walk	KB	1996	check	check	check
Handstand	Hand Walk	Hand Walk II	KB	1996	check	check	check
Handstand	Hand Walk	Hand Walk Tower	KB	1997	check	check	X mark
Handstand	Hand Walk	Hand Walk III	KB	1997	check	check	check
Handstand	Hand Walk	Hand Walk Building	KB	2000	check	check	X mark
Handstand	Hand Walk	Hand Walk IV	KB	16 December 2000	check	check	X mark
Handstand	Hand Walk	Hand Walk World	TW	10 May 2003	check	X mark	X mark
Handstand	Hand Walk	Street Hand Walk	GM	15 October 2003	check	X mark	X mark
Handstand	Hand Walk	Hand Walk Climbing	SMK	15 May 2005	check	check	X mark
Pogo stick	Kangaroo		KB	1997	check	check	check
Kinjiro	Kinjiro		TT	8 January 2008	check	X mark	X mark
Survival Attack	Kunoichi		KB	22 December 2001	check	check	check
Unicycle	Like a Pierrot	Like a Pierrot	KB	1996	check	check	check
Unicycle	Like a Pierrot	Like a Pierrot II	KB	1996	check	check	check
Unicycle	Like a Pierrot	Like a Pierrot III	KB	1996	check	check	check
Unicycle	Like a Pierrot	Like a Pierrot IV	KB	1997	check	check	check
Unicycle	Like a Pierrot	Like a Pierrot V	KB	1998	check	check	check
Unicycle	Like a Pierrot	Like a Pierrot Ghost	KB	25 November 2000	check	check	check
Egg-and-spoon race	Million Spoon	Million Spoon	TK	13 October 2012	check	X mark	X mark
Egg-and-spoon race	Million Spoon	Million Spoon II	TK	1 June 2013	check	X mark	X mark
Monkey bars	Monkey Bars	Monkey Bars	TW	19 October 2002	check	X mark	X mark
Monkey bars	Monkey Bars	Untei Derby	SC	13 June 2007	check	X mark	X mark
Rafting	Muscle Focus		KB	1996	check	check	X mark
Survival Attack	Nakama	Nakama	KB	28 July 2001	check	check	check
Survival Attack	Nakama	Nakama in Naeba	KB	2 February 2002	check	check	X mark
Wheelbarrow	Neko de Drive	Neko de Drive	KB	April 1998	check	check	check
Wheelbarrow	Neko de Drive	Neko de Drive in Naeba	KB	3 February 2001	check	check	X mark
Wheelbarrow	Neko de Drive	Neko de Drive II	KB	11 August 2001	check	check	X mark
Wheelbarrow	Neko de Drive	Neko de Drive World in Naeba	TW	22 February 2003	check	X mark	X mark
Waiting staff	Ottoto 9	Ottoto 9	KB	1997	check	check	check
Waiting staff	Ottoto 9	A Craftsman	KB	July 1999	check	check	X mark
Survival Attack, Strongman	Pancratium		OK	27 April 2004	check	X mark	X mark
Survival Attack, Strongman	Power Island		KB	Unaired	X mark	X mark	X mark
Survival Attack	Sasuke		KB	27 September 1997	check	check	check
Survival Attack	Sasuke Junior		KB	4 July 1998	check	check	X mark
Survival Attack	Sasuke Junior		TW	31 May 2003	check	X mark	X mark
Survival Attack	Sasuke Junior		SJ	24 January 2025	check	X mark	X mark
Survival Attack	Sasuke Senior		TW	14 June 2003	check	X mark	X mark
Survival Attack	Hanzo		HZ	24 March 2025	check	X mark	X mark
Survival Attack	Musou		MS	23 March 2026	check	X mark	X mark
Skateboarding	Skeboarder	Skeboarder	KB	1997	check	check	check
Skateboarding	Skeboarder	Skeboarder II	KB	1999	check	check	X mark
Skateboarding	Skeboarder	Kasso	KS	18 March 2024	check	check	check
Snowboarding	Snow-X		KB	5 February 2000	check	check	X mark
Dominoes	Sponge Bridge	Sponge Bridge	KB	1996	check	check	check
Dominoes	Sponge Bridge	Sponge Bridge II	KB	1997	check	check	check
Dominoes	Sponge Bridge	Sponge Bridge 99	KB	1999	check	check	check
Ninja	Spider Walk		KB	1996	check	check	check
Survival Attack, Homemaking	Strong Mama		KB	30 October 1999	check	check	check
Survival Attack, Strongman	Strong Papa		KB	1999	check	check	X mark
Survival Attack, Dog agility	Super Dog	Super Dog	KB	13 October 2001	check	check	X mark
Survival Attack, Dog agility	Super Dog	Super Dog II	KB	8 December 2001	check	check	X mark
Survival Attack, Dog agility	Super Dog	Super Dog III	KB	13 April 2002	check	check	X mark
Survival Attack, Dog agility	Super Dog	Super Dog World	TW	8 February 2003	check	X mark	X mark
Survival Attack, Dog agility	Super Dog	Intellidog	TW	3 May 2003	check	X mark	X mark
Survival Attack, Dog agility	Super Dog	Doggie Maze	SC	13 June 2007	check	X mark	X mark
Survival Attack, Dog agility	Super Dog	Dog Adventure	TT	8 January 2008	check	X mark	X mark
RC helicopter	Super Helico	Super Helico	KB	25 April 1998	check	check	check
RC helicopter	Super Helico	Super Helico II	KB	24 April 1999	check	check	X mark
Bike Trials	Super Rider	Super Rider	KB	1997	check	check	check
Bike Trials	Super Rider	Super Rider II	KB	1997	check	check	check
Bike Trials	Super Rider	Super Rider III	KB	24 January 1998	check	check	check
Bike Trials	Super Rider	Super Rider IV	KB	1999	check	check	X mark
Bike Trials	Super Rider	Super Rider V	KB	21 October 2000	check	check	X mark
Bike Trials	Super Rider	Super Rider World	TW	3 May 2003	check	X mark	X mark
Bike Trials	Super Rider	Super Rider Gold	GM	4 February 2004	check	X mark	X mark
Head-carrying	Vase Transporter		KB	Unaired	X mark	X mark	X mark
Survival Attack	Viking		VK	22 March 2005	check	check	check

=== Sporting-based events ===
==== Panel events ====
Events based around carnival style target practice. Typically a target will have 9 targets and competitors will have 12 attempts to hit them. Later versions introduced bigger boards, and lower prizes achieved for getting bingos on the board. These events were never broadcast outside Asia.

Sport	Event		First Seen On		Broadcast Region		
Sport	English name	Variant	Series	Start date	Japan	Asia	Global
Basketball	9Hoops	9Hoops	KB	19 October 1996	check	check	X mark
Basketball	9Hoops	9Hoops II	KB	1997	check	check	X mark
Basketball	9Hoops	9Hoops ~hide~	KB	1998	check	check	X mark
Basketball	9Hoops	9Shooter	KB	19 August 2000	check	check	X mark
Basketball	9Hoops	Capricious 9Hoops	KB	14 July 2001	check	check	X mark
Volleyball	Attack	Nippon ChaChaCha	KB	1997	check	check	X mark
Volleyball	Attack	Attack ChaChaCha	KB	1998	check	check	X mark
Volleyball	Attack	Attack Muscle	GM	24 March 2004	check	X mark	X mark
Volleyball	Attack	Bingoball	TK	11 January 2011	check	X mark	X mark
Volleyball	Attack	Volley Struck Out	TK	25 July 2015	check	X mark	X mark
Volleyball	Attack	Bingoball 25	TK	7 May 2016	check	X mark	X mark
Volleyball	Attack	Othelloball 36	TK	24 September 2022	check	X mark	X mark
Golf	Balloon Shooter	Balloon Shooter	KB	16 December 2000	check	check	X mark
Golf	Balloon Shooter	Super Shot	KB	1999	check	check	X mark
Golf	Balloon Shooter	Balloon Shooter World	TW	21 December 2002	check	X mark	X mark
Golf	Balloon Shooter	Balloon Shooter Gold	GM	19 November 2003	check	X mark	X mark
Golf	Balloon Shooter	Balloon Hitter	TT	11 December 2007	check	X mark	X mark
Golf	Balloon Shooter	Approach Shot	KG	31 December 2014	check	X mark	X mark
Batting (Baseball)	Breakthrough King		TK	4 February 2017	check	X mark	X mark
Dodgeball	Cannonball Catch		KB	Unaired	X mark	X mark	X mark
Tennis	Extreme Rally		KG	31 December 2016	check	X mark	X mark
Soccer	Freekick Extreme		KG	31 December 2012	check	X mark	X mark
Billiards	Hustler	Hustler	KB	1998	check	check	X mark
Billiards	Hustler	Hustler 2	KB	22 July 2000	check	check	X mark
Billiards	Hustler	Super Hustler	TW	23 November 2002	check	X mark	X mark
Rugby	Kick the Eight		KG	31 December 2015	check	X mark	X mark
Soccer	Kick Target	Kick Target	KB	1996	check	check	X mark
Soccer	Kick Target	Kick Target II	KB	1998	check	check	X mark
Soccer	Kick Target	Kick Target III	KB	21 October 2000	check	check	X mark
Soccer	Kick Target	Kick Target Bingo	KB	5 August 2000	check	check	X mark
Soccer	Kick Target	Kick Target 2001	KB	28 April 2001	check	check	X mark
Soccer	Kick Target	Kick Target 2002	KB	26 January 2002	check	check	X mark
Soccer	Kick Target	Long Shoot	KB	1997	check	check	X mark
Soccer	Kick Target	Super Freekick	TW	26 October 2002	check	X mark	X mark
Soccer	Kick Target	Kick Target World	TW	9 November 2002	check	X mark	X mark
Soccer	Kick Target	Kick-off	TW	23 November 2002	check	X mark	X mark
Soccer	Kick Target	Kick Target Gold	GM	12 November 2003	check	X mark	X mark
Soccer	Kick Target	Number Hunter	SMK	30 July 2006	check	check	X mark
Soccer	Kick Target	Kick Target 2007	TT	23 October 2007	check	X mark	X mark
Soccer	Kick Target	Kick Target Bingo (2015)	TK	25 July 2015	check	X mark	X mark
Soccer	Kick Target	Ultimate Volley	KG	31 December 2015	check	X mark	X mark
Volley (football)	Lifting High		TK	1 November 2014	check	X mark	X mark
Table tennis	Ping Pong Smash		SC	26 September 2007	check	X mark	X mark
Soccer	Pinpoint Shot		KG	31 December 2014	check	X mark	X mark
Bowling	Punch Out	Punch Out	KB	1997	check	check	X mark
Bowling	Punch Out	Punch Out II	KB	1998	check	check	X mark
Bowling	Punch Out	Punch Out III	KB	1999	check	check	X mark
Bowling	Punch Out	Partner Punch Out	TW	8 March 2003	check	X mark	X mark
Bowling	Punch Out	Punch Out Gold	GM	28 January 2004	check	X mark	X mark
Bowling	Punch Out	Flying Bowling	SC	13 June 2007	check	X mark	X mark
Bowling	Punch Out	Split Crash	TK	21 November 2011	check	X mark	X mark
Penalty kick	Robo-keeper	Robo-keeper Koji	TK	9 April 2012	check	X mark	X mark
Penalty kick	Robo-keeper	Robo-keeper Koji ver.2	TK	21 May 2012	check	X mark	X mark
Penalty kick	Robo-keeper	Giant Koji	TK	20 February 2016	check	X mark	X mark
Batting (Baseball)	Robo-pitcher	Robo-pitcher	TK	27 February 2016	check	X mark	X mark
Batting (Baseball)	Robo-pitcher	Hyper-robo Ohtani	TK	23 September 2023	check	X mark	X mark
Tennis	Service Ace	Service Ace	KB	1997	check	check	X mark
Tennis	Service Ace	Service Ace 2	KB	19 May 2001	check	check	X mark
Batting (Baseball)	Spray Hitter	Spray Hitter	KB	1997	check	check	X mark
Batting (Baseball)	Spray Hitter	Spray Hitter Bingo	KB	2000	check	check	X mark
Batting (Baseball)	Spray Hitter	Spray Hitter World	TW	23 November 2002	check	X mark	X mark
Batting (Baseball)	Spray Hitter	Spray Hitter Gold	GM	26 November 2003	check	X mark	X mark
Pitching (Baseball)	Struck Out	Big Arch	KB	1997	check	check	X mark
Pitching (Baseball)	Struck Out	Perfect Arms	KB	21 April 2001	check	check	X mark
Pitching (Baseball)	Struck Out	Struck Out	KB	1996	check	check	X mark
Pitching (Baseball)	Struck Out	Struck Out ver. 2	KB	14 December 1996	check	check	X mark
Pitching (Baseball)	Struck Out	Struck Out ver. 3	KB	1997	check	check	X mark
Pitching (Baseball)	Struck Out	Struck Out ver. 4	KB	1999	check	check	X mark
Pitching (Baseball)	Struck Out	Struck Out Cross	KB	1999	check	check	X mark
Pitching (Baseball)	Struck Out	Struck Out Turtle	KB	1999	check	check	X mark
Pitching (Baseball)	Struck Out	Struck Out Bingo	KB	2000	check	check	X mark
Pitching (Baseball)	Struck Out	Struck Out Bingo ver. 2	KB	2000	check	check	X mark
Pitching (Baseball)	Struck Out	Struck Out Bingo ver. 3	KB	2000	check	check	X mark
Pitching (Baseball)	Struck Out	Struck Out 2001	KB	5 May 2001	check	check	X mark
Pitching (Baseball)	Struck Out	Struck Out 2002	KB	19 January 2002	check	check	X mark
Pitching (Baseball)	Struck Out	Million Catch	TW	19 October 2002	check	X mark	X mark
Pitching (Baseball)	Struck Out	Struck Out World	TW	2 November 2002	check	X mark	X mark
Pitching (Baseball)	Struck Out	Struck Out Gold	GM	29 October 2003	check	X mark	X mark
Pitching (Baseball)	Struck Out	Golden Buster	SMK	18 June 2006	check	check	X mark
Pitching (Baseball)	Struck Out	Struck Out 2007	SC	12 September 2007	check	X mark	X mark
Pitching (Baseball)	Struck Out	Struck Out 2012	TK	8 December 2012	check	X mark	X mark
Pitching (Baseball)	Struck Out	Brain Pitching	KG	31 December 2013	check	X mark	X mark
Pitching (Baseball)	Struck Out	Perfect Score	KG	31 December 2014	check	X mark	X mark
Diving	Super Dive		KB	1997	check	check	X mark
Field goal (rugby)	Super Touchdown	Super Touchdown	KB	1997	check	check	X mark
Field goal (rugby)	Super Touchdown	Ruby Kick Target	TK	19 December 2015	check	X mark	X mark
Frisbee	UFO		KB	1997	check	check	X mark

==== 100-second challenges ====
The first major revision to panel events, in these versions competitors must but between 12 and 31 targets. In this version, they have unlimited attempts, but a strict 100 second time limit is in place. These events were only broadcast within Japan.

Sport	Event		First Seen On		Broadcast Region		
Sport	English name	Variant	Series	Start date	Japan	Asia	Global
Volleyball	Attack 20		TK	23 September 2017	check	X mark	X mark
Badminton	Badminton Smash	Badminton Smash 20	TK	26 May 2018	check	X mark	X mark
Badminton	Badminton Smash	Badminton Smash 20 ver. 2	TK	14 November 2020	check	X mark	X mark
Basketball	Basket Shooting	Basket Shooting 20	TK	10 March 2018	check	X mark	X mark
Basketball	Basket Shooting	3P Shot 12	TK	8 February 2020	check	X mark	X mark
Basketball	Basket Shooting	3P Shot 15	TK	20 June 2020	check	X mark	X mark
Basketball	Basket Shooting	Basket Shooting 21	TK	16 December 2023	check	X mark	X mark
Golf	Golf Shot	Golf Shot 20	TK	29 July 2017	check	X mark	X mark
Golf	Golf Shot	Golf Shot 21	TK	10 March 2018	check	X mark	X mark
Golf	Golf Shot	Golf Shot 15	TK	14 December 2019	check	X mark	X mark
Golf	Golf Shot	Golf Shot 15 ver. 2	TK	20 February 2021	check	X mark	X mark
Golf	Golf Shot	Golf Shot 15 ver. 3	TK	20 March 2021	check	X mark	X mark
Batting (Baseball)	Hit the Target	Hit the Target 15	TK	13 May 2017	check	X mark	X mark
Batting (Baseball)	Hit the Target	Hit the Target 16	TK	2 December 2017	check	X mark	X mark
Batting (Baseball)	Hit the Target	Hit the Target 20	TK	2 November 2019	check	X mark	X mark
Batting (Baseball)	Hit the Target	Hit the Target 20 ver. 2	TK	12 December 2020	check	X mark	X mark
Field hockey	Hockey Shot 15		TK	13 April 2019	check	X mark	X mark
Soccer	Kick Target	Kick Target 20	TK	10 June 2017	check	X mark	X mark
Soccer	Kick Target	Kick Target 20 ver. 2	TK	20 January 2018	check	X mark	X mark
Soccer	Kick Target	Kick Target 20 ver. 3	TK	12 May 2018	check	X mark	X mark
Field goal (rugby)	Kick the Eight ver. 2		TK	16 February 2019	check	X mark	X mark
Table tennis	Hyakyu Smash	Smash 30	TK	18 March 2017	check	X mark	X mark
Table tennis	Hyakyu Smash	Smash 31	TK	29 July 2017	check	X mark	X mark
Table tennis	Hyakyu Smash	Smash 21	TK	31 October 2020	check	X mark	X mark
American football	Shotgun Target		TK	7 March 2020	check	X mark	X mark
Tennis	Tennis Shot	Tennis Shot 20	TK	3 February 2018	check	X mark	X mark
Tennis	Tennis Shot	Tennis Shot 21	TK	25 May 2019	check	X mark	X mark
Tennis	Tennis Shot	Tennis Shot 21 MAX	TK	27 July 2019	check	X mark	X mark
Tennis	Tennis Shot	Tennis Shot 20 ver. 2	TK	5 October 2019	check	X mark	X mark
Volley (football)	Volley Shot 15		TK	30 March 2019	check	X mark	X mark

==== Moving Target Events ====
The 2nd major revision to panel events. In these versions, competitors attempt courses that are limited by the stage itself moving away, or that are split into stage. These versions have not aired outside Japan.

Sport	Event		First Seen On		Broadcast Region		
Sport	English name	Variant	Series	Start date	Japan	Asia	Global
Soccer	Monster 20	Monster 20	TK	28 November 2020	check	X mark	X mark
Soccer	Monster 20	Monster 20 Neo	TK	29 May 2021	check	X mark	X mark
Soccer	Monster 20	Monster 20 Ōkubo ver.	TK	6 August 2022	check	X mark	X mark
Soccer	Monster 20	Monster 20 Neo ver. 2	TK	3 December 2022	check	X mark	X mark
Table tennis	Pinpoint 20		TK	18 September 2021	check	X mark	X mark
Basketball	Pittling 20	Pittling 20	TK	4 September 2021	check	X mark	X mark
Basketball	Pittling 20	Hundred Samurai	HS	17 March 2025	check	X mark	X mark
Archery	Shot the Clock		TK	15 October 2016	check	X mark	X mark
Baseball	Struck 10		TK	16 November 2024	check	X mark	X mark
Volleyball	Target Attack 10		TK	16 March 2024	check	X mark	X mark

==== Other Sports Events ====
Events based on common sports that are not target events.

Sport	Event		First Seen On		Broadcast Region		
Sport	English name	Variant	Series	Start date	Japan	Asia	Global
Soccer	100 Person	Kick-Off	KG	31 December 2013	check	X mark	X mark
Fencing	100 Person	Three Musketeers	KG	31 December 2012	check	X mark	X mark

=== General Athletics Events ===
Events based on the traditional athletics disciplines of track and field and gymnastics. Many of these overlap with Sportsman No.1 . These events occasionally aired outside Asia.

Sport	Event		First Seen On		Broadcast Region		
Sport	English name	Variant	Series	Start date	Japan	Asia	Global
Backflip	50m Backflip		KB	1996	check	check	X mark
Multi-disciplinary	50m Bridge		SMK	30 April 2006	check	check	X mark
Pull-up	Anywhere Pump Up		KB	1998	check	check	X mark
Trapeze, Basket toss	Aerial Octopus		KB	Unaired	X mark	X mark	X mark
Balance beam	Athletic Love		KB	1997	check	check	check
Rings (gymnastics)	Arm Ring		TK	17 September 2012	check	X mark	X mark
Crawling	Baby Dash		SC	27 June 2007	check	X mark	X mark
Basket toss	Banzai 90	Banzai 90	KB	1997	check	check	check
Basket toss	Banzai 90	Banzai 90 ver. 2	KB	28 October 2000	check	check	check
Running	The Basilisk		TK	10 September 2022	check	X mark	X mark
Sumo	Battle SUMO		OK	13 April 2004	check	X mark	X mark
Beach Flags	Beach Flags		KB	1995	check	X mark	X mark
Multi-disciplinary	Brutal Labo		TW	12 October 2002	check	X mark	X mark
Sprinting	Clock Athlete		KB	1995	check	X mark	X mark
Push-up	The Final Push-up		KB	1995	check	X mark	X mark
Sit-up	The Final Sit-up		KB	1995	check	X mark	X mark
Running, Trivia	Intro Running		TT	22 January 2008	check	X mark	X mark
Push-up	Let's Push-up		OK	1 June 2004	check	X mark	X mark
Walking	Let's Walk		OK	25 May 2004	check	X mark	X mark
Vault (gymnastics)	Monster Box		KB	1995	check	X mark	X mark
Push-up, Sit-up, Back extension, Squat	Muscle Gym	Muscle Gym	KB	1997	check	check	check
Push-up, Sit-up, Back extension, Squat	Muscle Gym	Muscle Gym ver. 2	ME	November 2000	check	X mark	X mark
Push-up	Quick Muscle	Quick Muscle	KB	1996	check	check	check
Push-up	Quick Muscle	Muscle Record 9 Minutes	KB	27 December 1997	check	check	X mark
Sprinting, Bartending	Shotbar Catch		SC	13 June 2007	check	X mark	X mark
High jump	Sky High		SC	20 June 2007	check	X mark	X mark
Multi-disciplinary	Strongman No.1		TK	23 September 2023	check	X mark	X mark
Multi-disciplinary	Topping Challenge		TK	15 October 2016	check	X mark	X mark
Trampoline	Trampoline		KB	1996	check	check	check
Wrestling	Untouchable		KB	1995	check	check	check
Dizzy bat, Sprinting	Vertigo		KB	Unaired	X mark	X mark	X mark

=== Other non-athletic events ===
Any event that does not fall under the other categories. In most cases, these are events of intellect.

Sport	Event		First Seen On		Broadcast Region		
Sport	English name	Variant	Series	Start date	Japan	Asia	Global
Memorization	Anywhere Doors		TT	23 October 2007	check	X mark	X mark
Circadian clock	Body Clock	Body Clock	KB	3 November 2001	check	check	X mark
Circadian clock	Body Clock	Body Clock World	TW	18 January 2003	check	X mark	X mark
Memorization	Brain Panic	Brain Panic	KB	1996	check	check	X mark
Memorization	Brain Panic	Brain Panic II	KB	1997	check	check	X mark
Memorization	Brain Panic	Brain Panic World	TW	25 January 2003	check	X mark	X mark
Memorization	Brain Panic	Brain Muscle	GM	15 October 2003	check	X mark	X mark
Daruma doll	Daruma	Daruma	KB	1996	check	check	check
Daruma doll	Daruma	Daruma 7 (Rainbow)	KB	1996	check	check	X mark
Daruma doll	Daruma	Daruma 7 Ace	KB	1997	check	check	check
Daruma doll	Daruma	Super Daruma	KB	1997	check	check	check
Daruma doll	Daruma	Daruma Tour	KB	1998	check	check	X mark
Fishing	Fishing Kyubei		KB	1999	check	check	X mark
Menko	Menko Stadium	Menko Stadium	KB	3 November 2001	check	check	X mark
Menko	Menko Stadium	Menko Struck Out	TW	25 January 2003	check	X mark	X mark
Menko	Menko Stadium	Menko Warrior	TW	12 April 2003	check	X mark	X mark
Escape room	Muscle Help		KB	Unaired	X mark	X mark	X mark
Jenga	Muscle Train		GM	15 October 2003	check	X mark	X mark
Reaction time	Number Attack		TK	17 December 2016	check	X mark	X mark
Deductive reasoning	Psychological Card Battle		TK	9 December 2015	check	X mark	X mark
Shooting	Quickdraw		GM	21 January 2004	check	X mark	X mark
Labyrinth	Rolling Seesaw		KB	Unaired	X mark	X mark	X mark
Weighing scale	Seesaw 60		KB	1996	check	check	check
Tangled rope maze	Spiderwebs		KB	Unaired	X mark	X mark	X mark
Kendama	Super Kendama		KB	1996	check	check	check
Memorization	Thirty		DG	15 February 2005	check	X mark	X mark

== Courses ==
Courses that are defeated are then recreated in an attempt to be made more difficult and thus "unbeatable". This is why there are different versions (I, II, III, IV, V) next to some names. Sometimes an obstacle is changed between attempts to conquer this game, so there are letters (A, B) next to the versions. This is most likely done because of the injuries caused by this obstacle. Some of these events have "break zones", where any competitor who reaches that point is allowed to take a 30-second break before they must continue on with the course.

- Amazing Road – Competitors must cross a 15-metre-long suspended beam while avoiding six turnstiles fitted with padded bars that can knock them off. This was the Final new event that aired in the US version.
- Athletic Love – Two people of a couple stand at either end of a bridge-like construct. They have 60 seconds to reach the center without falling off or using their hands. This challenge has had three victories. The third victory aired only in Japan.
- Bamboo Derby (On Ultimate Banzuke renamed: "Walking Tall") I, IIA, IIB, III – Obstacle course where competitors walk on stilts. Between IIA and IIB, Snow Mountain was the first mountain obstacle but due to its punishing difficulty, it was replaced by the easier Green Mountain. This challenge has had 2 victories. In the first Bamboo derby, a competitor cleared the event, but due to him skipping a stepping stone, he was disqualified.
- Banzai 90 – A six-person team has 90 seconds to launch one of their own onto each of four padded logs hanging several feet above the floor. When all four logs are taken, they must hold their position for 10 more seconds. The logs are of varying heights: Red – 11 ft 4 in, yellow – 10 ft 7 in, green – 10 ft 1 in, and blue – 9 ft 1 in. This challenge had 4 victories.
- Daruma 7 – A 'daruma' sits atop a stack of 7 blocks. Competitors use a sledgehammer to knock out each block from the bottom up without letting the 'daruma' (or any other section) fall off. This challenge has had 4 victories, 2 in a modified version below. One of these victories was Yakult Swallows superstar catcher Atsuya Furuta.
  - Super Daruma – Modified version of Daruma 7 which has 9 blocks to knock out instead of 7.
  - Daruma 7 Ace – Modified version of Daruma 7 which the blocks start out small and get larger. This version of the challenge has 2 victories. The 2nd victory was only aired in Japan.
  - Daruma 7 Rainbow – Modified version of Daruma 7 in Colors version which the blocks start out in purple and last block in red. This version only aired in Japan.
- Extra Kendama – Competitors play with a life-size kendama. They have 60 seconds to swing the ball onto the large cup, then onto the small cup, and finally onto the central spike without dropping the kendama.
- Giant Ball – Obstacle course where competitors stay atop a 5-foot-wide ball without ever falling off or even straying from the course. If a 5-foot-wide ball gets stuck in pothole, contestants will need to escape within the 10-second limit.
- Hand Walk I, IIa, IIb, IIIA, IIIB, IV – Obstacle course where competitors walk on their hands. This course has a break zone. Between IIIA and IIIB, the Conveyor Belt was changed to Bamboo Bridge. As for IIa and IIb, the Rolling Hills were changed to the Hills and Stairs. This challenge has had 4 victories. The competitor that defeated Hand Walk III was aired only in Japan, but it remains unknown. The fourth version only aired in Japan (But shown only Introduction clip in US version). and Special version is "Hand Walk Building" is held in TBS building and "Hand Walk Tower" aired only Japan too.
- Kangaroo – Obstacle course where competitors use a pogo stick. This course has a break zone.
- Like a Pierrot I, II, III, IV, V, Ghost – Obstacle course where competitors ride a unicycle. This event has had 8 victories, the most of any challenge.
- Muscle Gym – Two competitors have to do as many sit-ups, back extensions, and push-ups as they can in 3 minutes. This challenge was played four times; by design, there was a victory each time it was played.
- Nakama – Two people run through an obstacle course while tethered together. They have 70 seconds to reach the end.
- Neko de Drive I, II, III – Obstacle course involving a man transporting a woman on a wheelbarrow that looks like a cat (a "neko (cat) cart"). The contestants have 60 seconds to complete the first four obstacles and reach the break zone. After that, the time is unlimited. This is the second course to undergo a numerical upgrade change without a victor. The second and third version only aired in Japan.
- Ottoto 9 – Obstacle course where competitors balance a metal pole on two fingers (hands in US Version). This obstacle is similar to Steady Voyage in Viking, The Ultimate Obstacle Course. Letting your pole fall or touch any metal obstacle results in failure. This course has a break zone. This challenge has had 1 victory. The event course have Second version and Change named called "A Craftsman", This version has only one competition, but aired only Japan. This course event is similar to Irritating Stick (Denryū Iraira Bō) from other Japanese Gameshow Ucchannanchan no Honō no Challenger: Kore ga Dekitara 100 Man En!! aired on TV Asahi (1995-2000), but that gameshow not use two finger, use hand holding and shorter metal stick than long metal pole.
- Quick Muscle – (On Ultimate Banzuke renamed: "Push Up Showdown") Two competitors have to do as many push-ups as they can in 3 minutes. The one who does more at the end of 3 minutes is declared the champion. Any time a competitor uses improper form, the penalty light goes on, deactivating that competitor's counter for 10 seconds. By design, there is a victory each time the challenge is played; all five wins were achieved by the same competitor. In one of them, a contender bit his lips hard enough to bleed, marking the first time to show blood in that show.
- Seesaw 60 – Two people stand atop a giant seesaw. They have 60 seconds to move a 10 kg barrel from one side to the other without letting either end of the seesaw touch the floor. A third person gets to call out advice to the other two people. This challenge has had 1 victory.
- Skateboarder I, II – Obstacle course where competitors ride a skateboard. This course has a break zone, where competitors only have to take a short break. This challenge has had 1 victory. Second version was only aired in Japan.
- Spider Walk – Competitors must climb through a 79-meter-long set of parallel walls, using their arms and legs to move forward without touching the ground. This course would later become the inspiration for the "Spider Walk" and "Jumping Spider" obstacles in Sasuke. This challenge has had 2 victories.
- Sponge Bridge I, II, III – Competitors have to walk atop three rows of giant foam blocks, each harder than the last. In third version, also original name called "Sponge Bridge 99". This was based on the Takeshi's Castle game 'Dominoes', and has also been used as 'Domino Hill' in stage 3 or Same the event courses name for later competitions of KUNOICHI. This course is the first to be updated to a new edition and advance numerically without being defeated first. This challenge has had 2 victories. Sponge Bridge III was the final event ever aired in the US Version.
- Super Helico I, II – Obstacle course involving a radio-controlled helicopter. This course has a break zone to allow the copter's batteries to be replaced. Although the US showed 1 victory, there were multiple victories only aired in Japan. The second version was only aired in Japan.
- Super Rider I, II, III, IV, VA, VB, VC – Obstacle course where competitors ride a bicycle (mountain bike trials). This challenge has had 6 victories. Two more courses were made and filmed, but never aired except in Japan (there are clips from the competition in the international versions). The fifth version have 3 version between VA, VB and VC and change some obstacles. Keigo Arizono's Super Rider III victory was the final victory aired in the US Version.
- Strong Mama – also known as original name "Kunoichi" aired in Japan, before held in Mt. Midoriyama First competition as Same original name or Women of Ninja Warrior. A course designed specifically for women. They have 60 seconds to clear the first five obstacles. After that, time is unlimited or still limited (50 seconds). The event course have 2 version between 1999 and 2000 version. in Man competitor version call "Strong Papa" but aired only Japan.
- Trampoline – Competitors must bounce off of trampolines onto stacks of foam blocks. This competition has three stages, and all competitors who complete the first stage are held until all competitors attempt the stage. Afterwards, all successful competitors attempt the second stage in the same manner.
- Untouchable – Four contestants face off, two at a time, 1-on-1 in a caged wrestling competition, with 3 batons each strapped to their bodies, on their back and each leg. The competitors must remove 2 out of 3 batons off of the other to win a match. After a baton is removed, competition ceases temporarily as the baton is placed in a box. The first person to win 2 matches is placed on the Banzuke. This challenge has had 1 victory.

"Struck Out", "Kick Target", etc. – These event course held Outside studio or Sport stadium and aired only Japan. The contest for the 2 million yen prize consisted of many games that formed the "2 Million Yen Dream Plan".

== Courses' obstacles ==
- Amazing Road -
  - First Turnstiles
  - Second Turnstiles
  - Third Turnstiles

Version #	Bamboo Derby Obstacles									Record
I	Checkerboard	Stepping Stones	Stairs	Suspension Bridge	Down Staircase	Hall of Hammers	Water Trench	Log Pile	S-Curve	1:11
IIA	Hurdles	Conveyor Belt	Snow Mountain	Two Curves	Stepping Stones	S-Ramp	Suspension Bridges	Hall of Hammers	Broken S-Curve	1:01
IIB	Hurdles	Conveyor Belt	Green Mountain	Two Curves	Stepping Stones	S-Ramp	Suspension Bridges	Hall of Hammers	Broken S-Curve	1:01
III	Propellers	Moving Net	Tires	Wicked Slope	Zig-Zag Decline	Swinging Logs	Pogo Posts	Stairs	Log Roll	None

- Banzai 90 - 4 Sandbags suspended in air
- Banzai 90 "2" - 4 Sandbags suspended in air
  - Green and Yellow bags on a Seesaw
  - Red log swings back and Forth
  - Blue log bounces up and down
- Daruma 7 -
  - 7 blocks
- Super Daruma -
  - 9 blocks
- Daruma 7 Ace -
  - 7 blocks smallest at the bottom, getting larger at the top. The final block is the same original size.
- Daruma 7 Rainbow -
  - 7 blocks, The block was in rainbow colored, Starting from the bottom, purple, blue, light blue, green, yellow, orange, and red at the top.
- Extra Kendama -
  - Large Cup
  - Small Cup
  - The Spike
- Giant Ball -
  - Downward Slope
  - Pothole Zone
  - Sloping Right Turn
  - Uphill Slope
  - Final Bridge

Version #	Hand Walk										Record
I	Parallel Bars	Stairway to Heaven	Bottomless Ravine		Devil's Double Bridge	BREAK ZONE	Craggy Mountain	Stairway to Hell	Heartbreak Hill	Single Bridge	0:54
IIA	Grid of Rails		Rolling Hills	Water Hazard		BREAK ZONE	Mountain of Logs	Suspension Bridge	Uneven Steps	Elevated S-Curve	1:15
IIB	Grid of Rails		Hills & Stairs	Water Hazard		BREAK ZONE	Mountain of Logs	Suspension Bridge	Uneven Steps	Elevated S-Curve	1:15
IIIA	Gravel Pile	Craggy Mountain	Log Ramp	Conveyor Belt	Green Incline	BREAK ZONE	Tram Car	Suspension Bridge	Cascading Climb	Volcano	None
IIIB	Gravel Pile	Craggy Mountain	Log Ramp	Bamboo Bridge	Green Incline	BREAK ZONE	Tram Car	Suspension Bridge	Cascading Climb	Volcano	None
IV	Saturn Slope	Shuttle Move	Rolling Star	Black Hole	BREAK ZONE	Mars Clash	Meteorite	Moon	Crescent Seesaw	Ramp	None

- Kangaroo -
  - The Steps
  - Zig-Zag Path
  - Mushrooms
  - Bushes
  - Narrow Bridge
  - BREAK ZONE
  - Checkerboard
  - Falling Stones
  - Neon Grid
  - Broken Bridge
- Muscle Gym
  - Sit-Ups
  - Back Lifts
  - Push-Ups

Version #	Neko De Drive										Record
I	Banana Turn	Watermelon Loop	Donut Loop	Mouse Trap	BREAK ZONE	Book Steps	Broken Piano	Slanted Path	Zig-Zag Wall	Fish Ribs	None
II	Great Wall China	Ganges River Bridge	Sphinx & Pyramid	Rome Tower	Bull Ring	BREAK ZONE	Arc de Triomphe	Safeco Field	Uluru	???	None

In Second version, No one made it to reach the One Final obstacle, so the One Final Obstacle is unknown

- Nakama
  - Twin Balance Bridge
  - Bob & Weave
  - Wiggle Bridge
  - Rolling Poles
  - Triple Step
  - Curved Mountain
  - Curved Valley
  - Curved Jump
  - Monkey Bars

Version #	Ottoto 9										Record
I (Ottoto 9)	Right Hand Curve	The Stairs	Crossbars	Cross Hammers	Narrowing Stairs	Narrow Bridge	BREAK ZONE	Propeller	Five Valleys	S-Curve	4:52
II (A Craftsman)	Rotating Gears	Blast Antennae	Giant Gear	Mainspring	Limit Bar	BREAK ZONE	Demon's Ring	???	???	???	None

In A Craftsman or Second Version, No one made it to reach the 3 Final obstacles, so the 3 Final Obstacles is unknown

Version #	Like A Pierrot										Record
I	Slalom	Sloped Hill		Zig-Zag Bridge	Corner Staircase	Spring Platforms	Pendulum	Gap	Final Staircase	Grooved Bridge	1:18
II	S-Curve Slalom	Ramp		Seesaw	Banked Turn	Pendulum	L-Bridge	Three Jumps	Staircase	Log Bridge	0:30
III	Perfect Circle	The Slalom Zone		The Ramp	S-Curve	The Steps	Hall Of Hammers	Zig-Zag Bridge	Three Tier Ramp	Narrow Bridge	3:03
IV	Time Trial		The Slalom	Stairs		Deadly Hammers	Zig-Zag Hill	Sword Ramp	Descending Slope	Narrow Bridge	2:41
V	Wheel Of Life		Flower Slalom	Cross Bridge	Boulder Dash	S-Curve	Seesaw	Conveyor Belt	Teeter Bridge	Raging Ramp	2:36
Ghost	Dilapidated Corridor		Graveyard	Bloodthirsty Axes	Death Heads	Staircase	Island	Coffin Seesaw	Narrow Zig-Zag	Narrow Bridge	None

Version #	Super Rider									Record
I	The Ditch	Rock Garden	Cable Spools	Two Big Steps	Narrow Zig-Zag	Broken Bridge	Death Valley	Steep Incline	Giant Drop	1:30
II	Sawtooth Hills	Rock Garden	Five Drums	One Track Bridge	Cable Spools	Ladders	Broken Platforms	Leap Of Faith		4:18
III	Sawtooth Hills	Turntables	Steps / Slope	Trampoline Jump	Rolling Rocks	High Step	Inclined Plank Bridge	Pedestals	Earth	4:06
IV	Jump Hill	Seesaw	Log Hop	U-Grooved Stairs	Gap	Suspension Bridge	Narrow Slopes	Drum Can Valley	Narrow Bridge	None
VA	Building Bank	Turnbank Roof	Stepping Stones	S-Curve	Powerline Hurdle	Narrow Slope	Skyscrapers	Bridge Piers	Ferris Wheel	None
VB	Seesaw	Turnbank Roof	Stepping Stones	S-Curve	Powerline Hurdle	Narrow Slope	Skyscrapers	Bridge Piers	Uphill Ramp	None
VC	Seesaw	Turnbank Roof	Stepping Stones	S-Curve	Powerline Hurdle	Narrow Slope	Apartments	Bridge Piers	Narrow Bridge	None

Version #	Strong Mama										Record
Ia (1999)	Sliding Bag	Mattress Beater	Cart Dash	Narrow Bridge	Bike Express	BREAK ZONE	Rolling Panic	Airwalk	Big Wheel	Wedding Cake	None
Ib (2000)	Sliding Bag	Reverse Conveyor	Bike Express	Narrow Bridge	Rolling Panic	BREAK ZONE	Airwalk	Cart Dash	Big Radish	Wedding Cake	None

- Super Helico
  - Slalom
  - Tower
  - Debris Tunnels
  - Cage
  - Cave
  - BREAK ZONE
  - Fans
  - Crazy Eight
  - Slider
  - Landing Pad
- Spider Walk
  - The Straightaway
  - Widening Corridor
  - 90° Turn
  - Ascending Corridor
  - Descending Corridor
  - Crossbar
  - S-Curve
- Skeboarder
  - Ollie Step
  - Rampage
  - Tube
  - Handrail
  - BREAK ZONE
  - Narrow Slopes
  - Stairs
  - Double Halfpipe
  - Big Canyon
  - Jump Ramp
- Sponge Bridge
  - Green Zone
  - Yellow Zone
  - Red Zone
- Sponge Bridge 2
  - Green Zone
  - Yellow Zone
  - Red Zone
- Sponge Bridge 3
  - Green Zone
  - Yellow Zone
  - Red Zone

== The Banzuke (The List of Champions) (Grouped by Course) ==
- Athletic Love — Atsushi & Michiko Hirata - 11.45s left, Naomi & Tatsuya Gunzi - 00.64s left.
- Bamboo Derby I — Hiroshi Kobayashi - 1:11
- Bamboo Derby II — Hiroshi Takahashi - 1:01
- Banzai 90 — Acrobatics Team - 45.79s left, Arm Wrestling Team - 36.53s left, Break Monkeys and Cheerleaders - 20.66s left, Nippon Sports Science University - 11.59s left
- Daruma 7 — Atsuya Furuta, Yoichi Fukaya, Yoshimitsu Nishiumi
- Daruma 7 Ace — Kazunori Harayama
- Hand Walk I — Aizu Nie - 2:11, Yukio Iketani - 54s
- Hand Walk II — Yuki Takahashi - 1:15,
- Like a Pierrot I — Fuyuki Tsuchiya - 1:45, Yuichi Ono - 1:18
- Like a Pierrot II — Natsuki Hata - 50s, Daiki Izumida - 47s, Yuichiro Kato - 30s
- Like a Pierrot III — Yuichiro Kato - 3:03
- Like a Pierrot IV — Yoshiaki Handa - 2:41
- Like a Pierrot V — Yoshiaki Handa - 2:21
- Muscle Gym — Jaguar Yokota - 126, Jimon Terakado - 159, Yasuei Yakushiji - 141, Shigeyuki Nakamura - 124
- Ottoto 9 — Tomoteru Fukuda - 4:52
- Quick Muscle — Kohei Asano (5 times)
- Seesaw 60 — Hiroyasu Matsukawa, Mitsuyoshi Tanaka, & Yuji Iwana (Boxing team) - 11.92s left
- Skeboarder — Kentaro Tanaka - 2:02
- Spider Walk — Shinobu Sekiya - 1:06, Kiyohara Yagi - 1:00
- Sponge Bridge — Makoto Tsuji - 31s, Shuichi Shirotori - 19s
- Super Helico — Yuji Kamiya - 4:31
- Super Rider I — Isamu Hasenaka - 1:30
- Super Rider II — Jaromír Spěšný - 4:18
- Super Rider III — Keigo Arizono - 4:06
- Untouchable — Yasutoshi Kujirai

== Unbeatable Banzuke ==
In 2007, G4 began airing subtitled version of Kinniku Banzuke under the title Unbeatable Banzuke. These edits would focus heavily on the course events, and would be the foundation for global rebroadcasts worldwide. The show was hosted by Rome Kanda from I Survived a Japanese Game Show as the host, Kei Kato. It airs in half-hour episodes, two or three games per episode, in its original Japanese language and partial original broadcast also with English subtitles. The player profiles, rules, and replays, however, are narrated by voice actor Dave Wittenberg, who also narrates Ninja Warrior. Upon the network's relaunch, the preview segment before the opening sequence has been removed.

* If the letters are gold, that means the challenge was defeated.

No.	Title	Original release date
1	"Hand Walk - Quick Muscle - Daruma 7"	February 3, 2008
2	"Hand Walk - Quick Muscle - Daruma 7"	February 3, 2008
3	"Hand Walk - Super Daruma - Bamboo Derby"	February 3, 2008
4	"Hand Walk - Seesaw 60 - Daruma 7"	February 3, 2008
5	"Hand Walk - Quick Muscle - Banzai 90"	February 3, 2008
6	"Bamboo Derby - Quick Muscle - Daruma 7"	February 3, 2008
7	"Hand Walk II - Daruma 7 - Bamboo Derby"	February 3, 2008
8	"Spider Walk - Trampoline - Hand Walk II"	February 3, 2008
9	"Like A Pierrot - Seesaw 60 - Daruma 7"	February 3, 2008
10	"Like A Pierrot - Daruma 7 - Seesaw 60"	February 3, 2008
11	"Kangaroo - Like A Pierrot - Daruma 7"	February 3, 2008
12	"Hand Walk II - Banzai 90 - Giant Ball"	February 3, 2008
13	"Bamboo Derby - Seesaw 60"	February 3, 2008
14	"Super Rider - Seesaw 60"	February 3, 2008
15	"Hand Walk II - Sponge Bridge"	February 3, 2008
16	"Sponge Bridge - Bamboo Derby"	February 3, 2008
17	"Hand Walk II - Giant Ball"	February 3, 2008
18	"Bamboo Derby II - Sponge Bridge"	February 3, 2008
19	"Like A Pierrot II - Ottoto 9"	February 3, 2008
20	"Like A Pierrot III - Ottoto 9"	February 3, 2008
21	"Sponge Bridge - Kangaroo"	February 3, 2008
22	"Hand Walk II - Muscle Gym - Ottoto 9"	February 3, 2008
23	"Like A Pierrot III - Daruma 7"	February 3, 2008
24	"Hand Walk III - Seesaw 60"	February 3, 2008
25	"Like A Pierrot III - Athletic Love"	February 3, 2008
26	"Kangaroo - Muscle Gym - Extra Kendama"	February 3, 2008
27	"Super Rider II - Neko De Drive"	February 3, 2008
28	"Like A Pierrot IV - Kangaroo"	February 3, 2008
29	"Hand Walk III - Super Helico"	February 3, 2008
30	"Bamboo Derby II - Kangaroo"	February 3, 2008
31	"Like A Pierrot IV - Sponge Bridge"	February 3, 2008
32	"Skeboarder - Bamboo Derby II"	February 3, 2008
33	"Super Rider II - Ottoto 9"	February 3, 2008
34	"Sponge Bridge - Daruma 7"	February 3, 2008
35	"Skeboarder - Bamboo Derby II"	February 3, 2008
36	"Hand Walk III - Bamboo Derby II"	February 3, 2008
37	"Skeboarder - Super Rider II"	February 3, 2008
38	"Super Rider III - Daruma 7"	February 3, 2008
39	"Skeboarder - Muscle Gym - Like A Pierrot IV"	February 3, 2008
40	"Sponge Bridge II - Kangaroo"	February 3, 2008
41	"Super Helico - Sponge Bridge II"	February 3, 2008
42	"Bamboo Derby III - Hand Walk III"	February 3, 2008
43	"Sponge Bridge II - Bamboo Derby III"	February 3, 2008
44	"Super Rider III - Neko De Drive"	February 3, 2008
45	"Super Helico - Daruma 7 Ace"	February 3, 2008
46	"Bamboo Derby III - Sponge Bridge II"	February 3, 2008
47	"Like A Pierrot V - Neko De Drive"	February 3, 2008
48	"Nakama - Banzai 90"	February 3, 2008
49	"Strong Mama - Super Helico"	February 3, 2008
50	"Super Rider III - Sponge Bridge II"	February 3, 2008
51	"Nakama - Super Rider III"	February 3, 2008
52	"Skeboarder - Neko De Drive"	February 3, 2008
53	"Strong Mama - Banzai 90"	February 3, 2008
54	"Like A Pierrot V - Untouchable"	February 3, 2008
55	"Nakama - Super Helico"	February 3, 2008
56	"Like A Pierrot V - Sponge Bridge II"	February 3, 2008
57	"Super Rider III - Daruma 7 Ace"	February 3, 2008
58	"Super Helico - Banzai 90"	February 3, 2008
59	"Like A Pierrot Ghost - Neko De Drive"	February 3, 2008
60	"Super Rider III - Sponge Bridge II"	February 3, 2008
61	"Nakama - Daruma 7"	February 3, 2008
62	"Amazing Road - Neko De Drive"	February 3, 2008
63	"Like A Pierrot Ghost - Bamboo Derby III"	February 3, 2008
64	"Hand Walk III - Super Rider III"	February 3, 2008
65	"Kangaroo - Sponge Bridge III"	February 3, 2008

Note: In G4 version, at Introduction start, Hand walk IV and Super Rider IV-V was put only Introduction but never air in US version after aired last episode.

== International adaptations ==
In the UK, Channel 5 made their own version of this show called Under Pressure. It featured many similar events, namely Hand Walk, Super Rider, Neko de Drive and Sponge Bridge. Games like Kick Target were separate segments normally attempted by athletes at various training facilities. For pictures of this version, check: UKgameshows

In Germany, Sat.1 made their own version of the show called Champions Day. It was similar in style to Under Pressure and again featured many similar events. It lasted four episodes. For pictures of this version, check: Here

In China, a spinoff of Taiiku Kai titled Beat the Champions began airing in 2016.

In Thailand, an adaptation based on G4's Unbeatable Banzuke called Unbeatable Banzuke Thailand was released, using the same graphics and visual style, with newly filmed segments of Quick Muscle, Bamboo Derby, Banzai 90, Ottoto 9, Neko de Drive, Seesaw 60 and Daruma 7.

Country	Foreign Title	Seasons	Episodes	Network (s)	Language (s)	Broadcast Dates		Host	Location (s)
Country	Foreign Title	Seasons	Episodes	Network (s)	Language (s)	First released	Last released	Host	Location (s)
China	来吧冠军 Beat the Champions	2	24	ZJTV	Chinese	3 April 2016	23 July 2017		
Germany	Champions Day – Die Show der Besten	4 Specials		Sat.1	German	28 January 2001	13 December 2001		
Thailand	ChampVSChamp (แชมป์เฉือนแชมป์) Unbeatable Banzuke Thailand	2	26	Modernine TV	Thai	22 October 2013	13 May 2014	Dusit Sirisombut, Koopt Kooptawatin	Bangkok, Thailand
United Kingdom	Under Pressure	1	10	Channel 5	English	1 September 2001	10 November 2001	Brian Blessed as Banzuke Brian	London, UK

== Other Media ==
An anime was produced by Bandai Visual titled Kinniku Banzuke: Kongou-kun no Daibouken! The anime was loosely based on the show, and featured a group of children invited to an island to fight to the death. It lasted three episodes.

Later, a second anime called Gold Muscle, which was based on Taiiku World, story based on a mad scientist who created clones, athletes fused with animal DNA to compete in various sports, 10 episodes total. But it was never shared worldwide due to controversy, as the characters were parodied based on real life sports celebrities. And it was never made into video distribution after broadcast. Broadcast starts from Oct 12th 2002 to Nov 9 2002, and later rebroadcast from Feb 15th 2003 to Mar 1st 2003 in Kanto region only.

== See also ==
- Kunoichi (Women's version of Sasuke)
- Sasuke (Known in America as Ninja Warrior)
- Viking: The Ultimate Obstacle Course
