= Kasso (TV series) =

Japanese sports entertainment game show

- Genre: Sports entertainment Obstacle course
- Created by: Shimon Iwazawa
- Country of origin: Japan
- Original language: Japanese
- No. of episodes: 7

Production
- Executive producer: Hayata Satake
- Producer: Yohei Yasunaga
- Running time: 60 minutes (KASSO 1-3); 240 minutes (KASSO 4)

Original release
- Network: Tokyo Broadcasting System (TBS) (KASSO 1-3); Red Bull TV (KASSO 4)
- Release: March 18, 2024 – present

Related
- Kinniku Banzuke

Kasso (stylised KASSO (Japanese: 滑走, Hepburn: kassō; lit. 'skating')) is a skateboarding gameshow television series originating from Japan. The series was created by Tokyo Broadcasting System Television (TBS), a network known for large-format obstacle course series such as Takeshi's Castle, Ninja Warrior, and Unbeatable Banzuke. Billed as the "Ninja Warrior of Skateboarding", Kasso has competitors attempt a series of obstacle courses with the goal of surviving through them all to win the title of Total Victory (完全制覇, kanzen seiha).

The concept for Kasso originated on the TBS series Unbeatable Banzuke, with a one-stage skateboarding obstacle course in the 1990s. In the 2020 Summer Olympics in Japan, skateboarding debuted as a new discipline, with Japan setting a commanding lead with 3 Gold, 1 Silver and 1 Bronze medal. Following this, skateboarding saw a large uptick in popularity in Japan. In the leadup to the 2024 Summer Olympics, TBS sought to capitalize on this success and commissioned a new series based on skateboarding.

The debut tournament of Kasso premiered in Mar 2024 as a late-night pilot series. Following low viewership and the unexpected payout of five ¥1,000,000 (US$9,112) grand prizes, the staff apologized for the balance and reception of the program. The day after the broadcast, the Kasso team uploaded a 13-minute highlight reel to YouTube, which became an unexpected viral success, reaching several million views. TBS decided to capitalize on this and announced that Kasso's second season would get a subtitled livestream in English and a heavy social media presence. It debuted to huge success, with many social media clips surpassing 10 million views.

Since this point in time, TBS has launched KASSO events in the United States and China, with the Japanese team travelling abroad to ensure consistent quality. TBS has indicated talks to expand to several other regions. In TBS's 2025 Investor Meeting, they announced intent to host a Kasso World Cup event in the future once more regions have established shows.

== Rules ==
=== Basic rules ===
In each stage, competitors are tasked with completing a designated obstacle course. The initial rounds do not require competitors to clear, opting to instead eliminate the competitors with the lowest performance. The final rounds are survival-based, where competitors must completely clear the course to advance.

Competitors are allowed to kick off at any time and can use their hands to maintain balance. Falling into water is always an elimination; however, whether or not falling off your board is a fail depends on the stage. Stages that are races or are timed typically do allow competitors to fall off their board, as the time it takes to recover is still a hindrance. In all stages, the competitor must have their board to hit the buzzer and complete the stage.

Competitors are given an open practice period where they may attempt all of the stages prior to recording; however, during the official tournament, the number of attempts on each course is limited to only 1 unless otherwise noted. In Kasso 4, competitors were given two attempts at Rail Coaster to counteract the historically low scores on this event. Additionally, competitors were given a second attempt at Million Jump LB at the request of the audience following weak overall results.

=== Format ===
Each tournament consists of four to five stages broken into two phases: The Elimination Phase, where between 1 and 4 competitors with the worst overall performance are eliminated from the competition, and the Survival Phase, where failing the course will result in the end of the competitor's run. Of these stages, there are five categories of stages that appear in a fixed order:

==== Downhill Stage ====
Each season begins with a downhill stage. This stage is a time trial through a downhill course with some basic jumps, ollies, and ramps and can typically be completed in around 1 minute, with the slowest competitors being eliminated.

==== Rail Stage ====
The second stage of the series is based upon rail grinding and balance. Progress is measured by the percentage of each competitor that made it through the course, with the weakest results dropping out. The first version, Uzushio, featured a spiral with narrowing width and sharper turns until it became a rail. The following Rail Coaster versions featured a straight rail with drops, humps, seesaws, and slight curves.

==== Balance Stage ====
It has appeared as the 3rd stage in approximately half of the tournaments. These stages feature harshly angled courses, measured by the percentage completion. These stages often feature no flat surfaces and difficult drops requiring high momentum and balance to complete. The first version, Origami, featured a large origami shape with all angled platforms. The second version, Grasshopper, featured 7 curved lilypads, all placed angled with large drops.

==== Course Stage ====
Appeared as the penultimate stage in Kasso seasons 1-3. Competitors must complete a timed obstacle course that includes half-pipes, humps, grinds, and gap jumps within a specified time limit. In the first two seasons, the time limit was a strict 31 seconds. In Kasso III, the course's time limit was increased to 63 seconds with four optional hidden buzzers that awarded two additional seconds. To accommodate the increased time limit, the course was made significantly more difficult.

==== Final Stage ====
The last stage. A mad dash to the end! This course features a rail and a sliding gate and typically takes around 10 seconds to complete. Rather than a typical time limit, this course's final gate is constantly moving, increasing the difficulty over time.

=== Course Overview by Season ===
| | Elimination Round | | | Survival Round | |
| # | Downhill Stage | Rail Stage | Balance Stage | Course Stage | Final Stage |
|---|---|---|---|---|---|
| 1 | Midoriyama Downhill | Uzushio | — | Tokyo Upside Down | Million Gate |
| 2 | Midoriyama Downhill SE | Rail Coaster | Origami | Tokyo Upside Down SE | Million Jump |
| 3 | Midoriyama Downhill SE | Rail Coaster GM | — | Da Park | Million Jump |
| 4 | Long Beach Downhill | Rail Coaster Big Boy Foy | Grasshopper | — | Million Jump LB |

== Series Overview ==
=== KASSO ===
KASSO Episodes
| # | Episode Title | Location | # of Contestants | Original Release Date |
|---|---|---|---|---|
| 1A (Note: Despite being the same tournament on the same course, KASSO I was filmed and released as two entirely separate half tournaments) | KASSO I | Yokohama, Japan | 9 | March 18, 2024 |
| 1B | KASSO I | Yokohama, Japan | 9 | March 25, 2024 |
| 2 | KASSO II | Yokohama, Japan | 15 | October 7 & 14, 2024 |
| 3 | KASSO III | Yokohama, Japan | 14 | March 13 & 16, 2025 |
| 4 | KASSO Fest: Skate and Sound | Long Beach, United States | 30 | March 22, 2026 (Note: The 1st group filmed the first three stages on March 21st, 2026. This group was only shown in short highlight reels during the broadcast of Day 2. The Finalists of the 1st group appeared alongside those in the 2nd Group at the end of the broadcast.) |

=== KASSO Gaiden ===
Gaiden, the Japanese word for "side story," are smaller, 1-stage trial events. While compilation videos have been released, these events have not received an official broadcast.

KASSO Gaiden Events
| # | Episode Title | Location | # of Contestants | Filming Date |
|---|---|---|---|---|
| GD1 | KASSO GD | San Francisco, United States | | February 15, 2025 |
| GD2 | KASSO GD IECP | Ikebukuro, Japan | 12 | March 26, 2025 |
| GD3 | KASSO GD: Aranya | Aranya, China | | October 6, 2025 |

=== Skateboarder ===
The predecessor to Kasso, made by the same network, Skateboarder, featured a single, untimed course stage featuring 9 obstacles. Unlike Kasso, competitors were not allowed to come to a complete stop unless stalling and might not put their foot down or kick off at any time.

Skateboarder Seasons
| # | Episode Title | Location | # of Contestants | Original Release Date |
|---|---|---|---|---|
| S1 | Skateboarder | Yokohama, Japan | 32 | 1997 |
| S2 | Skateboarder II | Yokohama, Japan | 32 | 1999 |

=== Mini KASSO ===
A special side season where competitors complete a small course, where points are awarded for each successful obstacle clear as well as for tricks

Mini Kasso Seasons
| # | Episode Title | Location | # of Contestants | Original Release Date |
|---|---|---|---|---|
| M1 | Skateboarder | Japan | 6 | July 19 to August 3, 2024 |

== Other Media ==
A mobile Endless runner game called "KASSO Gaiden: Escape from the Skaterverse" was released for iOS and Android in February 26th, 2026

== Season Summaries ==
✔ Stage completed
✘ Stage failed
➤ Stage failed, but made it far enough, fast enough to advance to the next Stage
⏲ Stage cleared, but competitor was eliminated due to having a slow time
ⓘ Withdrew from the competition due to injury or last-minute scheduling conflict

=== KASSO 1 - Group A ===
| Competitor | | Elimination Phase | | Survival Phase | |
| Country | Name | Midoriyama Downhill | Uzushio | Tokyo Upside-Down | Million Gate |
|---|---|---|---|---|---|
| JPN | Hayate Kamimura | 0:58.33 | check | check | check |
| JPN | Kuta Inukawa | 1:00.96 | 85% | — | — |
| JPN | Mana Sasaki | 1:01.86 | 92% | check | X mark |
| JPN | PENPEN | 1:02.84 | — | — | — |
| JPN | Rinku Konishi | 0:58.30 | check | check | check |
| JPN | Ryo Sagawa | 1:06.65 | 93% | check | X mark |
| JPN | Shogo Tanaka | X mark | — | — | — |
| JPN | Taiyo Shibasaki | 1:02.02 | 95% | X mark | — |
| JPN | Yuto Sugawara | 1:01.66 | 85% | X mark | — |
| | Total Attempts | 9 | 7 | 6 | 4 |

=== KASSO 1 - Group B ===
| Competitor | | Elimination Phase | | Survival Phase | |
| Country | Name | Midoriyama Downhill | Uzushio | Tokyo Upside-Down | Million Gate |
|---|---|---|---|---|---|
| JPN | Aiki Arakaki | 1:07.52 | check | check | check |
| JPN | Ayaru Matsuki | 1:07.83 | 73% | X mark | — |
| JPN | Daisuke Nakamura | 1:08.16 | 70% | — | — |
| JPN | Kento Urano | 1:02.09 | 81% | check | X mark |
| JPN | Ren Suematsu | 0:58.67 | 99% | check | check |
| JPN | Sora Negishi | 1:03.31 | 95% | check | X mark |
| JPN | Takuya Ishizuka | 1:09.25 | — | — | — |
| JPN | Wakyo Sakamoto | 1:07.73 | 94% | check | check |
| JPN | Yuta Ishizuka | 1:10.19 | — | — | — |
| | Total Attempts | 9 | 7 | 6 | 5 |

=== KASSO 2 ===
| Competitor | | Elimination Phase | | | Survival Phase | |
| Country | Name | Midoriyama Downhill SE | Rail Coaster | Origami | Tokyo Upside-Down SE | Million Jump |
|---|---|---|---|---|---|---|
| JPN | Aoi Ishimaru | 0:57.31 | — | — | — | — |
| JPN | Ayahiro Uratsuka | 0:59.56 | — | — | — | — |
| JPN | Hayate Kamimura | 0:56.41 | 31% | 89% | check | X mark |
| USA | Leo Romero | 0:54.75 | 16% | 71% | X mark | — |
| LAT | Madars Aspe | 0:48.81 | 12% | 68% | X mark | — |
| JPN | Mana Sasaki | 0:52.03 | 24% | 73% | check | X mark |
| JPN | Ren Suematsu | 0:49.95 | 72% | 72% | X mark | — |
| JPN | Rinku Konishi | 0:50.06 | 16% | 70% | X mark | — |
| JPN | Ryo Motohashi | 0:50.93 | 27% | 92% | X mark | — |
| JPN | Shogo Tanaka | 0:53.44 | 9% | 67% | — | — |
| JPN | Sora Negishi | 0:55.64 | 15% | 70% | X mark | — |
| USA | Wes Kramer | 0:54.75 | 20% | 67% | X mark | — |
| JPN | Yurin Fujii | 0:55.65 | 8% | — | — | — |
| JPN | Yuno Takahashi | 0:50.14 | 10% | 68% | X mark | — |
| JPN | Yuro Nagahara | 0:55.11 | Withdrew | — | — | — |
| | Total Attempts | 15 | 12 | 11 | 10 | 2 |

=== KASSO 3 ===
| Competitor | | Elimination Phase | | Survival Phase | |
| Country | Name | Midoriyama Downhill SE | Rail Coaster GM | Da Park | Million Jump |
|---|---|---|---|---|---|
| JPN | Aimu Yamazuki | 0:55.13 | 14% | X mark | — |
| CAN | Cordano Russell | 0:48.76 | 15% | X mark | — |
| USA | Greyson Fletcher | 0:48.22 | 16% | X mark | — |
| JPN | Hayate Kamimura | 0:55.82 | 20% | X mark | — |
| JPN | Issei Sakurai | 0:51.05 | 28% | X mark | — |
| USA | Jamie Foy | 0:48.10 | 14% | X mark | — |
| USA | Jiro Platt | 0:50.35 | 21% | check | check |
| USA | Mason Silva | 0:50.31 | 16% | check | X mark |
| JPN | Mei Sugawara | 1:00.45 | — | — | — |
| JPN | Ren Suematsu | 0:49.96 | 22% | X mark | — |
| JPN | Rinku Konishi | 0:54.42 | 28% | X mark | — |
| USA | Roman Hager | 0:50.37 | 19% | X mark | — |
| JPN | Ryo Motohashi | 0:52.34 | 20% | X mark | — |
| JPN | Yuno Takahashi | 0:50.67 | 11% | — | — |
| | Total Attempts | 14 | 13 | 11 | 2 |

=== KASSO 4 ===
Groups A and B competed separately for the elimination phase and then completed the survival phase together. Downhill results with no time indicate the time is not known as it was not included in the broadcast.

| Competitor | | | Elimination Phase | | | Survival Phase | |
| Country | Name | Group | Midoriyama Downhill LB | Rail Coaster BBF | Grasshopper | Million Jump | |
| Country | Name | Group | Midoriyama Downhill LB | Rail Coaster BBF | Grasshopper | Attempt 1 | Attempt 2 |
|---|---|---|---|---|---|---|---|
| USA | Aaron Homoki | A | 0:49.74 | — | — | — | — |
| JPN | Ayahiro Uratsuka | A | 0:50.80 | — | — | — | — |
| USA | Braden Hoban | A | check | 37% | 4 | — | — |
| USA | CJ Collins | B | 0:40.36 | 14% | — | — | — |
| CAN | Cordano Russell | B | 0:37.90 | 27% | 3 | — | — |
| USA | Dashawn Jordan | A | check | 29% | 6 | X mark | X mark |
| USA | David Loy | A | check | 22% | 6 | X mark | X mark |
| USA | Dominick Walker | B | 0:45.66 | — | — | — | — |
| USA | Gavin Bottger | B | 0:37.09 | 49% | check | X mark | X mark |
| UK | Georgia Martin | B | 0:44.06 | 12% | — | — | — |
| USA | Greyson Fletcher | B | 0:45.59 | — | — | — | — |
| JPN | Hayate Kamimura | B | 0:37.99 | 33% | check | X mark | X mark |
| USA | Jamie Foy | A | check | 48% | 7 | X mark | X mark |
| USA | Jiro Platt | B | 0:37.94 | 37% | check | X mark | check |
| USA | Julian Lewis | B | 0:39.26 | 21% | 2 | — | — |
| JPN | Kento Urano | B | 0:36.83 | 41% | 3 | — | — |
| NOR | Kevin Baekkel | B | 0:35.89 | 39% | 2 | — | — |
| USA | Kyle Walker | A | check | >37% | 4 | — | — |
| USA | Leo Romero | B | 0:38.66 | 46% | 2 | — | — |
| USA | Olan Prenatt | A | Withdrew | — | — | — | — |
| BRA | Pedro Delfino | B | 0:38.26 | 21% | 2 | — | — |
| USA | Poe Pinson | B | 0:43.64 | 22% | 3 | — | — |
| USA | Raphae Ueda | A | check | 44% | 4 | — | — |
| JPN | Ren Suematsu | B | 0:42.73 | 19% | 7 | — | — |
| JPN | Sora Negishi | A | check | 18% | — | — | — |
| USA | Taylor Kirby | A | check | 23% | 1 | — | — |
| USA | Tom Schaar | A | check | >18% | X mark | — | — |
| USA | Torey Pudwill | A | check | 21% | 1 | — | — |
| JPN | Yurin Fujii | A | check | 16% | — | — | — |
| JPN | Yuro Nagahara | A | check | 21% | 4 | — | — |
| | Total Attempts | | 29 | 25 | 21 | 6 | 6 |

== List of Winners ==
=== KASSO ===
Main Season Winners
| # | Season | Country | Competitor | Prize |
|---|---|---|---|---|
| 1 | 1 | JPN | Rinku Konishi | ¥1,000,000 |
| 2 | 1 | JPN | Hayate Kamimura | ¥1,000,000 |
| 3 | 1 | JPN | Wakyo Sakamoto | ¥1,000,000 |
| 4 | 1 | JPN | Ren Suematsu | ¥1,000,000 |
| 5 | 1 | JPN | Aiki Arakaki | ¥1,000,000 |
| 6 | 3 | USA | Jiro Platt | ¥1,000,000 |
| 7 | 4 | USA | Jiro Platt | $10,000 USD |

=== KASSO Gaiden ===
The list of known winners of Kasso Gaiden. It is known that there were at least 4 additional clears in Kasso Gaiden 1; however, their identity is currently not known.

Gaiden Winners
| Season | Country | Competitor | Prize |
|---|---|---|---|
| GD1 | USA | Louie Lopez | — |
| GD1 | USA | Dashawn Jordan | — |
| GD1 | USA | MacGregor Munson | — |
| GD2 | | | — |
| GD3 | JPN | Sora Negishi | ¥50,000 RMB |

=== Skeboarder ===
Skeboarder Winners
| Season | Country | Competitor | Prize |
|---|---|---|---|
| S1 | JPN | Kentaro Tanaka | ¥3,000,000 |
| S2 | CAN | Moses Itkonen | ¥3,000,000 |

=== Mini KASSO ===
Mini KASSO Winners
| Season | Country | Competitor | Notes |
|---|---|---|---|
| M1 | JPN | Kaede Terauchi | Won with a top score of 1,100 points for clear all obstacles and landing a BS Flip |

== List of Course Records ==
Below are a list of the best

| Event | Version | Season | Best Result | Clear Time (seconds) | Result By |
|---|---|---|---|---|---|
| Downhill | Midoriyama Downhill | 1 | Clear | 58.30 | Rinku Konishi |
| Downhill | Midoriyama Downhill SE | 2 | Clear | 48.81 | Madars Aspe |
| Downhill | Midoriyama Downhill SE | 3 | Clear | 48.10 | Jamie Foy |
| Downhill | Long Beach Downhill | 4 | Clear | | |
| Rail | Uzushio | 1 | Clear | N/A | Rinku Konishi, Hayate Kamimura, Aiki Arakaki |
| Rail | Rail Coaster | 2 | 72% | N/A | Ren Suematsu |
| Rail | Gaiden IECP | GD2 | Clear | | |
| Rail | Rail Coaster GM | 3 | 28% | N/A | Issei Sakurai |
| Rail | Rail Coaster Big Boy Foy | 4 | 49% | N/A | Gavin Bottger |
| Balance | Origami | 2 | 92% | N/A | Ryo Motohashi |
| Balance | Grasshopper | 4 | Clear | 17.11 seconds | Gavin Bottger |
| Course | Tokyo Upside Down | 1 | Clear | 27.07 seconds | Hayate Kamimura |
| Course | Tokyo Upside Down SE | 2 | Clear | 28.57 seconds | Hayate Kamimura |
| Course | Gaiden San Francisco | GD1 | Clear | 18.75 seconds | Louie Lopez |
| Course | Da Park | 3 | Clear | 9.00 seconds | Jiro Platt |
| Million | Million Gate | 1 | Clear | N/A | Hayate Kamimura, Rinku Konishi, Wakyo Sakamoto, Ren Suematsu, Aiki Arakaki |
| Million | Million Jump | 2-3 | Clear | N/A | Jiro Platt |
| Million | Gaiden Aranya | GD3 | Clear | N/A | Sora Negishi |
| Million | Million Jump LB | 4 | Clear | N/A | Jiro Platt |

== List of Kasso Competitors ==
Below is an alphabetical list of every competitor who has appeared on a main season of KASSO, as well as officially confirmed competitors from the Kasso Gaiden tournaments.

| Competitor | | | Main Seasons | | | | Gaiden | | | Mini |
| Country | Name | # | 1 | 2 | 3 | 4 | 1 | 2 | 3 | 1 |
|---|---|---|---|---|---|---|---|---|---|---|
| USA | Aaron Homoki | 1 | | | | check | | | | |
| JPN | Aiki Arakaki | 1 | check | | | | | | | |
| JPN | Aimu Yamazuki | 1 | | | check | | | | | |
| USA | Antonio Durao | 1 | | | | | check | | | |
| JPN | Aoi Ishimaru | 1 | | check | | | | | | |
| JPN | Ayahiro Uratsuka | 2 | | check | | check | | | | |
| JPN | Ayaru Matsuki | 1 | check | | | | | | | |
| CHN | Boss Xie | 1 | | | | | | | check | |
| USA | Braden Hoban | 1 | | | | check | | | | |
| USA | CJ Collins | 1 | | | | check | | | | |
| CAN | Cordano Russell | 2 | | | check | check | | | | |
| JPN | Daiki Ikeda | 1 | | | | | | check | | |
| JPN | Daisuke Ikeda | 1 | | | | | | check | | |
| JPN | Daisuke Nakamura | 1 | check | | | | | | | |
| USA | Dashawn Jordan | 3 | | | | check | check | check | | |
| USA | David Loy | 1 | | | | check | | | | |
| USA | Dominick Walker | 1 | | | | check | | | | |
| USA | Eric Koston | 1 | | | | | | check | | |
| USA | Gavin Bottger | 1 | | | | check | | | | |
| UK | Georgia Martin | 1 | | | | check | | | | |
| JPN | Ginwoo Onodera | 1 | | | | | | check | | |
| USA | Grant Taylor | 1 | | | | | check | | | |
| USA | Greyson Fletcher | 2 | | | check | check | | | | |
| JPN | Hayate Kamimura | 4 | check | check | check | check | | | | |
| JPN | Hiroyuki Matsuo | 1 | | | | | | | check | |
| DEN | Hugo Boserup | 1 | | | | | check | | | |
| JPN | Issei Sakurai | 1 | | | check | | | | | |
| USA | Jamie Foy | 2 | | | check | check | | | | |
| CHN | Jayden Zhang | 1 | | | | | | | check | |
| USA | Jiro Platt | 2 | | | check | check | | | | |
| USA | Julian Lewis | 1 | | | | check | | | | |
| JPN | Junnosuke Yonesaka | 1 | | | | | | | check | |
| JPN | Kaede Terauchi | 2 | | | | | | | check | check |
| JPN | Kai Kishi | 1 | | | | | | | check | |
| JPN | Kento Urano | 2 | check | | | check | | | | |
| NOR | Kevin Baekkel | 1 | | | | check | | | | |
| JPN | Keyaki Ike | 2 | | | | | | check | check | |
| JPN | Kuta Inukawa | 1 | check | | | | | | | |
| USA | Kyle Walker | 1 | | | | check | | | | |
| USA | Leo Romero | 2 | | check | | check | | | | |
| USA | Louie Lopez | 2 | | | | | check | check | | |
| USA | MacGregor Munson | 1 | | | | | check | | | |
| LAT | Madars Aspe | 1 | | check | | | | | | |
| JPN | Mana Sasaki | 2 | check | check | | | | | | |
| USA | Mason Silva | 1 | | | check | | | | | |
| JPN | Mei Sugawara | 1 | | | check | | | | | |
| JPN | Miyuu Ito | 1 | | | | | | check | | |
| USA | Olan Prenatt | 1 | | | | check | | | | |
| BRA | Pedro Delfino | 1 | | | | check | | | | |
| JPN | PENPEN | 1 | check | | | | | | | |
| USA | Poe Pinson | 1 | | | | check | | | | |
| JPN | Raimu Sasaki | 1 | | | | | | | check | |
| USA | Raphae Ueda | 1 | | | | check | | | | |
| JPN | Ren Suematsu | 4 | check | check | check | check | | | | |
| JPN | Riku Ando | 1 | | | | | | | | check |
| JPN | Rinku Konishi | 3 | check | check | check | | | | | |
| USA | Roman Hager | 1 | | | check | | | | | |
| JPN | Ryo Motohashi | 4 | | check | check | | | check | check | |
| JPN | Ryo Sagawa | 1 | check | | | | | | | |
| JPN | Ryo Sejiri | 1 | | | | | | | check | |
| JPN | Shimon Iwazawa | 2 | | | | | | | check | check |
| JPN | Shogo Tanaka | 2 | check | check | | | | | | |
| JPN | Sora Negishi | 4 | check | check | | check | | | check | |
| JPN | Sora Shirai | 1 | | | | | | check | | |
| JPN | Taiyo Shibasaki | 2 | check | | | | | | | check |
| JPN | Takuya Ishizuka | 1 | check | | | | | | | |
| USA | Taylor Kirby | 1 | | | | check | | | | |
| JPN | Tokiya Imamura | 1 | | | | | | | | check |
| USA | Tom Schaar | 1 | | | | check | | | | |
| USA | Torey Pudwill | 1 | | | | check | | | | |
| JPN | Tsubasa Takahagi | 1 | | | | | | | | check |
| JPN | Urano Kento | 1 | | | | | | | | |
| JPN | Wakyo Sakamoto | 1 | check | | | | | | | |
| USA | Wes Kramer | 1 | | check | | | | | | |
| JPN | Yurin Fujii | 4 | | check | | check | | check | check | |
| JPN | Yuno Takahashi | 2 | | check | check | | | | | |
| JPN | Yuro Nagahara | 3 | | check | | check | | check | | |
| JPN | Yushiaki | 1 | | | | | | | check | |
| JPN | Yuta Ishizuka | 1 | check | | | | | | | |
| JPN | Yuto Sugawara | 1 | check | | | | | | | |
| | Total known competitors | | 18 | 15 | 14 | 30 | 10+ | 12 | 14 | 6 |

== See also ==
- Kinniku Banzuke
- Ninja Warrior (franchise)
