= Pan Pacific Swimming Championships =

Non-European long-course swimming event

The Pan Pacific Swimming Championships is a long course swimming event first held in 1985. It was founded as an alternative to the European Championships, for those countries that could not swim in those championships, in a manner similar to the Four Continents Figure Skating Championships which provide a similar 'continental' championships for non-European nations.

The meet was founded by its four Charter nations's swimming federations: Swimming Australia (Australia), Swimming Canada (Canada), Japan Swimming Federation (Japan), and USA Swimming (United States). As part of the Charter, hosting of the meet is to rotate among these four nations, with the meet being held in Japan every other championship. Initially, the meet was open to all countries that border the Pacific Ocean, giving the meet its name. This since has been expanded/opened to include other non-European countries wishing to participate, such as Brazil and South Africa.

The meet is considered to be one of the toughest international swimming competitions outside the Olympic Games, World Championships and European Championships, due in part to the presence of swimming power-house nationals like the United States and Australia, the first and second most medals winners, respectively.

== History ==
The meet was initially staged biennially (every odd year), to allow for an international championship-level meet in the non-Olympic and non-World Championships years. However, beginning with the 2002 championships, due to the changing of the World Championships from every four years (even year between Olympics) to every two years (every odd year), the meet is a quadrennial event, held in the even year between Summer Olympics.

Unlike the World Championships and Olympic Games, nations can enter as many people as they like in the preliminaries of each event (in most international meets, only two swimmers from each nation are permitted). However, only two swimmers per nation can qualify for the Championships' semi-finals and finals. Prior to FINA's creation of semi-finals in the late 1990s, a total of 3 swimmers per country could qualify for the final and consolation heats of an event, with no more than 2 swimmers per country in a final or consolation.

== List of championships ==
Edition	Year	Host city	Host country	Dates	Medal table winners	Second in the medal table	Third in the medal table	Ref.
1	1985	Tokyo	Japan	15–18 August	United States	Australia	Canada	
2	1987	Brisbane	Australia	13–16 August	United States	Australia	Canada	
3	1989	Tokyo	Japan	17–20 August	United States	Australia	Canada	
4	1991	Edmonton	Canada	22–25 August	United States	Australia	Canada	
5	1993	Kobe	Japan	12–15 August	United States	Australia	Japan	
6	1995	Atlanta	United States	10–13 August	United States	Australia	Japan	
7	1997	Fukuoka	Japan	10–13 August	United States	Australia	Japan	
8	1999	Sydney	Australia	22–29 August	Australia	United States	South Africa	
9	2002	Yokohama	Japan	24–29 August	United States	Australia	Japan	
10	2006	Victoria	Canada	17–20 August	United States	Japan	Australia	
11	2010	Irvine	United States	18–22 August	United States	Australia	Japan	
12	2014	Gold Coast	Australia	21–25 August	United States	Australia	Japan	
13	2018	Tokyo	Japan	9–13 August	United States	Australia	Japan	
14	2026	Irvine	United States	12–15 August	United States	Australia	Canada	
15	2030	Brisbane	Australia	TBA	TBD	TBD		

Note: The 1995 and 1999 editions served as the swimming test events for the Olympic venues.

== Medal table (1985–2026) ==
All-time Pan Pacific Championships medal table (Updated after 2026 Championships)

Rank	Nation	Gold	Silver	Bronze	Total
1	United States	296	214	149	659
2	Australia	113	147	116	376
3	Japan	34	52	79	165
4	Canada	21	49	80	150
5	China	7	11	16	34
6	South Africa	5	11	13	29
7	New Zealand	4	6	19	29
8	South Korea	4	2	1	7
9	Brazil	3	4	12	19
10	Costa Rica	3	2	4	9
11	Puerto Rico	1	0	1	2
12	Germany	1	0	0	1
12	Suriname	1	0	0	1
14	Mexico	0	1	0	1
14	Venezuela	0	1	0	1
16	Argentina	0	0	1	1
16	Italy	0	0	1	1
Totals (17 entries)		493	500	492	1,485
