= Hanji Aoki =

Japanese shot putter and official

- 青木 半治
- Born: July 16, 1915; Chiba Prefecture, Japan
- Died: May 30, 2010 (aged 94); Japan
- Occupation: Sports official
- Years active: 1938–1999
- Notable work: President of the Japanese Olympic Committee (1969–1973); President of the Japan Association of Athletics Federations (1975–1999); Vice President of the IAAF (1991–1999)
- Awards: Olympic Order (Silver, 1985); Order of the Sacred Treasure (1986); IAAF Golden Order of Merit (2007)
- Honors: Honorary citizen of Tokyo (1988); Honorary life vice president of the IAAF

Hanji Aoki (青木 半治, Aoki Hanji; 16 July 1915 – 30 May 2010) was a Japanese sports official.

He hailed from Chiba Prefecture. He was an active shot putter in his younger days, and became Japanese champion in 1938. He was president of the Japanese Olympic Committee from 1969 to 1973 and the Japan Association of Athletics Federations from 1975 to 1999, and vice president of the International Association of Athletics Federations from 1991 to 1999. At stepping down he was titled as honorary life vice president.

He was decorated with the Olympic Order in silver in 1985, the Order of the Sacred Treasure in 1986 and the IAAF Golden Order of Merit in 2007. Since 1988 he was an honorary citizen of Tokyo. He died from heart failure in 2010.

Sporting positions
Preceded by Prince Tsuneyoshi Takeda	President of the Japanese Olympic Committee; 1969–1973	Succeeded by Masashi Tabata
Preceded by Kenzō Kōno	President of the Japan Association of Athletics Federations; 1975–1999	Succeeded by Yōhei Kōno
Preceded by Kenji Fukunaga	Chairman of the Japan Sports Association; 1989–1993	Succeeded by Sumiko Takahara
