= Hiroshi Shimomura =

- 下村 宏
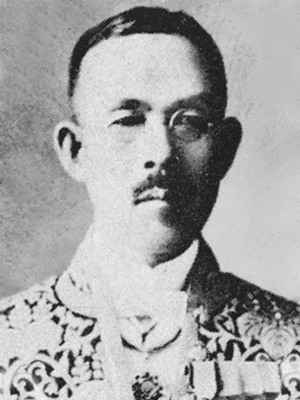
- circa 1934

Member of the House of Peers
- In office 12 January 1937 – 22 February 1946 Nominated by the Emperor

Chief of General Affairs, Government-General of Taiwan
- In office 20 October 1915 – 11 July 1921
- Governors General: Andō Teibi; Akashi Motojiro; Den Kenjirō
- Preceded by: Uchida Kakichi
- Succeeded by: Kaku Sagataro

Personal details
- Born: 11 May 1875 Wakayama, Japan
- Died: 9 December 1957 (aged 82) Gotanda, Tokyo, Japan
- Education: Tokyo Imperial University

Hiroshi Shimomura (Japanese: 下村宏; 11 May 1875 – 9 December 1957) was a Japanese official who served as minister of state and director general of the Cabinet Intelligence Bureau in 1945, at the end of World War II. In that capacity, he was involved in realising the Emperor's surrender broadcast.

He was the fourth president of the Japanese Olympic Committee (1937–1942), and a graduate of Tokyo Imperial University.

Political offices
| Preceded by Uchida Kakichi | Civil Administrator of the Governorate-General of Taiwan; 1915–1921 | Succeeded by Kaku Sagatarō |
| Preceded by Taketora Ogata | Head of the Cabinet Intelligence Bureau; 1945 | Succeeded by Taketora Ogata |
Academic offices
| Preceded by Kazushige Ugaki | President of Takushoku University; 1945–1946 | Succeeded by Torajirō Takagaki |
Sporting positions
| Preceded by Matahiko Oshima | President of the Japanese Olympic Committee; 1937–1942 | Succeeded by Ryōzō Hiramuma |
