= Seiichi Kishi =

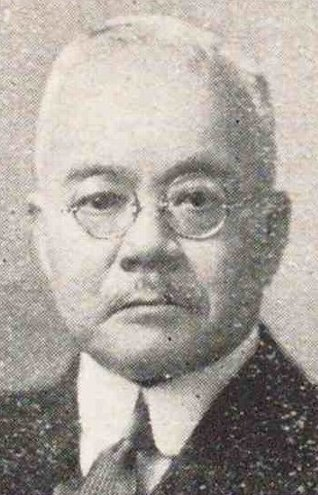
Kishi Seiichi

Seiichi Kishi (Japanese: 岸清一; August 3, 1867 – October 29, 1933) was the 2nd President of the Japanese Olympic Committee (1921–1933).

Sporting positions
Preceded by Kanō Jigorō	President of the Japanese Olympic Committee; 1921–1933	Succeeded by Matahiko Oshima
