= Matahiko Oshima =

Ōshima Matahiko
- 大島 又彦
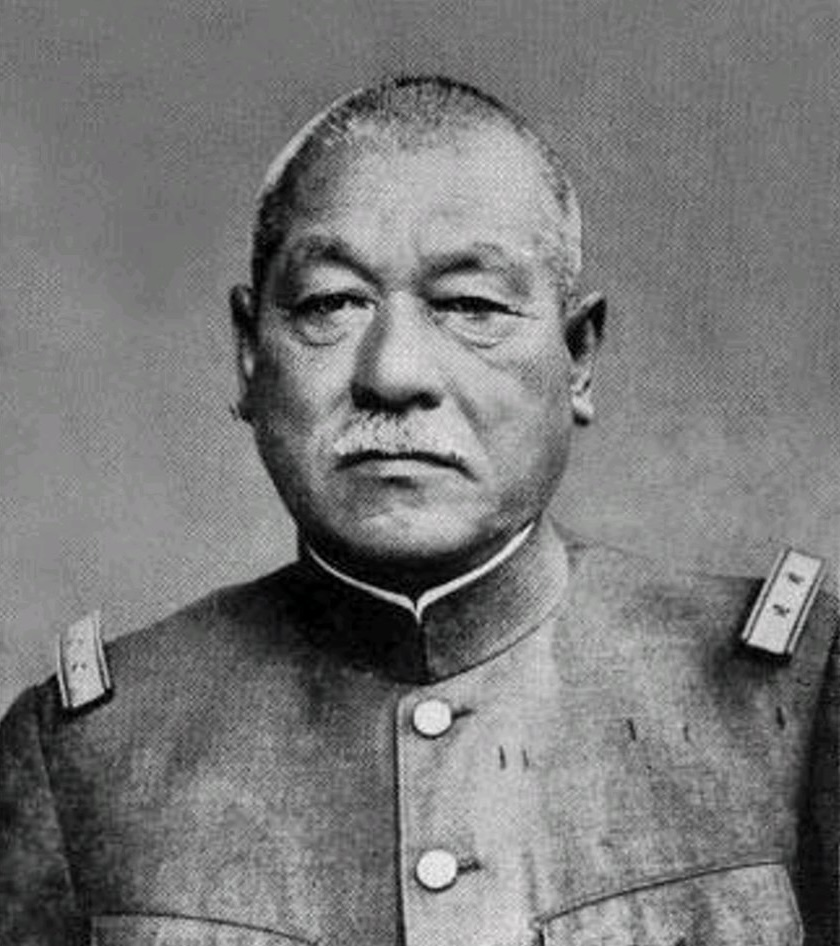
- Born: October 22, 1872; Saga Prefecture, Japan
- Died: February 24, 1953 (aged 80)
- Education: Imperial Japanese Army Academy
- Military career
- Allegiance: Empire of Japan
- Branch: Imperial Japanese Army
- Service years: 1893–1926
- Rank: Lieutenant General
- Commands: IJA 4th Cavalry Regiment; IJA 6th Cavalry Regiment; IJA Cavalry School; IJA 14th Division
- Awards: Order of the Rising Sun, 4th Class; Order of the Golden Kite, 4th Class
- Other work: President of the Japanese Olympic Committee

Matahiko Ōshima (大島 又彦, Ōshima Matahiko; October 22, 1872 – February 24, 1953) was a lieutenant general in the Imperial Japanese Army and 3rd President of the Japanese Olympic Committee (1936–1937). He retired from the army in 1926 after 33 years of service.

== Biography ==
Ōshima was a native of Saga Prefecture. He attended the 3rd class of the Imperial Japanese Army Academy and was commissioned as a second lieutenant in the cavalry in 1893. In 1911 he became commander of the IJA 4th Cavalry Regiment. He was promoted to colonel in September 1912, and in October 1913 commanded the IJA 6th Cavalry Regiment. He was promoted to major general in July 1918 and made commandant of the Cavalry School. In August 1922, Ōshima was promoted to lieutenant general. He was assigned command of the newly-formed IJA 14th Division in March 1926 and entered the reserves shortly thereafter.

Ōshima was chosen to head the Japanese equestrian team at the 1932 Summer Olympics in Los Angeles. One of his team members, Takeichi Nishi won the gold medal at this event for show jumping. Ōshima was later selected to become chairman of the Japanese Olympic Committee for the 1936 Summer Olympics in Berlin, and continued to be active in the promotion of Japanese sports to his death.

== Decorations ==
- 1901 – Order of the Rising Sun, 4th class
- 1901 – Order of the Golden Kite, 4th class

== Footnotes ==
Sporting positions
Preceded by Seiichi Kishi	President of the Japanese Olympic Committee; 1936–1937	Succeeded by Hiroshi Shimomura
