= Japanese Olympic Committee =

- Country: Japan
- Code: JPN
- Created: 1911
- Recognized: 1912
- Continental Association: OCA
- Headquarters: Tokyo, Japan
- President: Seiko Hashimoto
- Secretary General: Ichiro Hoshino
- Website: joc.or.jp

The Japanese Olympic Committee (日本オリンピック委員会, Nippon Orinpikku Iinkai; JOC) is the National Olympic Committee in Japan for the Olympic Games movement, based in Tokyo, Japan. It is a non-profit organisation that selects teams and raises funds to send Japanese competitors to Olympic events organised by the International Olympic Committee (IOC).

The Japanese Olympic Committee has helped organise every bid for an Olympic Games by a Japanese city to date. Japan has held the Olympic Games four times: the Summer Olympics twice (1964 Summer Olympic Games and the 2020 Summer Olympics, both in Tokyo) and the Winter Olympics twice (the 1972 Winter Olympics in Sapporo and the 1998 Winter Olympic Games in Nagano).

New badge for Team Japan, to be used at Beijing 2022 and in future Games.

== Presidents ==
No.	Years	Name
1	1911–1921	Kanō Jigorō
2	1921–1933	Seiichi Kishi
3	1936–1937	Matahiko Oshima
4	1937–1942	Hirishi Shimomura
5	1945–1946	Ryōzō Hiramuma
6	1947–1958	Ryotaro Azuma
7	1959–1962	Jyuichi Tsushima
8	1962–1969	Prince Tsuneyoshi Takeda
9	1969–1973	Hanji Aoki
10	1973–1977	Masaji Tabata
11	1977–1989	Katsuzi Shibata
12	1989–1990	Yoshiaki Tsutsumi
13	1990–1999	Hironoshin Furuhashi
14	1999–2001	Yushirō Yagi
15	2001–2019	Tsunekazu Takeda
16	2019–2025	Yasuhiro Yamashita
17	2025–	Seiko Hashimoto

== Executive committee ==
The committee of the JOC is represented by:

- President: Seiko Hashimoto
- Vice Presidents: Yuko Mitsuya, Morinari Watanabe
- Secretary General: Yuki Ota
- Senior Members: Mikako Kotani, Kaori Hoshi, Hajime Hayashi, Kōsei Inoue, Yuri Yagi

== Member federations ==
Japan National Federations are the organizations that coordinate all aspects of their individual sports. They are responsible for training, competition and development of their sports. There are currently 34 Olympic Summer and 6 Winter Sport Federations in Japan.

National Federation	Summer or Winter	Headquarters
All Japan Archery Federation	Summer	Shibuya, Tokyo
Japan Association of Athletics Federations	Summer	Tokyo
Nippon Badminton Association	Summer	Shibuya, Tokyo
Baseball Federation of Japan	Summer	Chūō, Tokyo
Japan Basketball Association	Summer	Bunkyō, Tokyo
Japan Biathlon Federation	Winter	Sapporo
Japan Bobsleigh and Luge Federation	Winter	Nagano, Nagano
Japan Amateur Boxing Federation	Summer	Shibuya, Tokyo
Japan Canoe Federation	Summer	Shibuya, Tokyo
Japan Clay Target Shooting Association	Summer	Shibuya, Tokyo
Japan Curling Association	Winter	Shibuya, Tokyo
Japan Cycling Federation	Summer	Shinagawa, Tokyo
Japan Equestrian Federation	Summer	Chūō, Tokyo
Japan Fencing Federation	Summer	Shibuya, Tokyo
Japan Football Association	Summer	Bunkyō, Tokyo
Japan Golf Association	Summer	Chūō, Tokyo
Japan Gymnastics Association	Summer	Shibuya, Tokyo
Japan Handball Association	Summer	Shinjuku, Tokyo
Japan Hockey Association	Summer	Shibuya, Tokyo
Japan Ice Hockey Federation	Winter	Shibuya, Tokyo
All Japan Judo Federation	Summer	Bunkyō, Tokyo
Japan Karate Federation	Summer	Koto-ku, Tokyo
Modern Pentathlon Association of Japan	Summer	Shibuya, Tokyo
Japan Mountaineering and Sport Climbing Association	Summer	Shibuya, Tokyo
National Rifle Association of Japan	Summer	Shibuya, Tokyo
Japan Roller Sports Federation	Summer	Tokyo
Japan Rowing Association	Summer	Shibuya, Tokyo
Japan Sailing Federation	Summer	Shibuya, Tokyo
Japan Skating Federation	Winter	Shibuya, Tokyo
Ski Association of Japan	Winter	Shibuya, Tokyo
Japan Softball Association	Summer	Shibuya, Tokyo
Nippon Surfing Association	Summer	Bunkyō, Tokyo
Japan Swimming Federation	Summer	Shibuya, Tokyo
Japan Table Tennis Association	Summer	Shibuya, Tokyo
All Japan Taekwondo Association	Summer	Minato, Tokyo
Japan Tennis Association	Summer	Shibuya, Tokyo
Japan Triathlon Union	Summer	Shibuya, Tokyo
Japan Volleyball Association	Summer	Shibuya, Tokyo
Japan Weightlifting Association	Summer	Shibuya, Tokyo
Japan Wrestling Federation	Summer	Shibuya, Tokyo

== See also ==
- Japan at the Olympics
- Onishi Tetsunosuke
- Japan Paralympic Committee
