= Masaji Tabata =

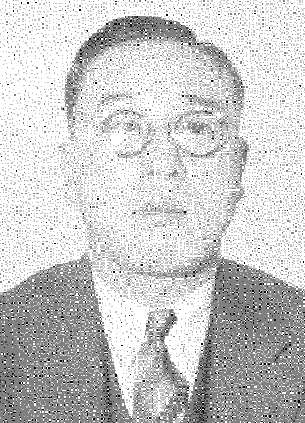
Masaji Tabata

Masaji Tabata (Japanese: 田畑政治) (December 1, 1898 – August 25, 1984) was a Japanese educator, journalist, and swimming coach. He was a key figure in Tokyo's successful bid to host the 1964 Summer Olympics. He served as the president of the Japanese Olympic Committee from 1973 to 1977.

== As a journalist ==
Tabata was born in Hamamatsu, Shizuoka Prefecture, to a family of sake brewery managers. He started working for the Asahi Shimbun after graduating from the University of Tokyo and covered political issues, including the 1936 attempted military coup.

== Involvement in sports ==
Tabata devoted his life to swimming. At the 1932 Los Angeles Olympics, he served as the head coach of Japan's swimming team, which won twelve medals, including five golds.

Tabata became the president of Japan Swimming Federation after World War II. Japan was excluded from international sporting events at the time and Tabata worked for his country's early return to world stage. He organized a national swimming championship to coincide with the 1948 London Olympics to show off Japanese swimmers' abilities. Competitors including Hironoshin Furuhashi and Shiro Hashizume finished faster than the gold medalists in London, but their records were not recognized worldwide because Japan was not a member of the International Swimming Federation. Their membership was accepted a year later.

Tabata served as the chef demission for Japan's delegation at the Helsinki Olympics in 1952 when his country's participation was accepted for the first time since the war. He held the same position in Melbourne four years later.

After Tokyo won the bid to host the 1964 Olympics, Tabata was appointed the head of the Games' organizing committee and lobbied for making women's volleyball an Olympic event. He was forced to resign before the Games due to a dispute over Japan's participation in the 1962 Asian Games. Indonesia, which hosted the event, refused to issue visas for athletes from Israel and Taiwan, and became at odds with the International Olympic Committee.

After the Tokyo Olympics, Tabata took part in the foundation of Tokyo Swimming Center, which later produced Olympic medalists including Kosuke Kitajima, Reiko Nakamura, and Haruka Ueda.

Tabata was involved in Japan's successful bid to host the 1972 Winter Olympics and became JOC president in 1973.

Tabata died in 1984. He was 85.

Sporting positions
Preceded by Izutaro Suehiro	President of Japan Swimming Federation; 1948-1957	Succeeded by Kazushige Higuchi
Preceded by Hanji Aoki	President of the Japanese Olympic Committee; 1973-1977	Succeeded by Katsuji Shibata

== See also ==
- Idaten
