= Ryōzō Hiranuma =

- 平沼 亮三
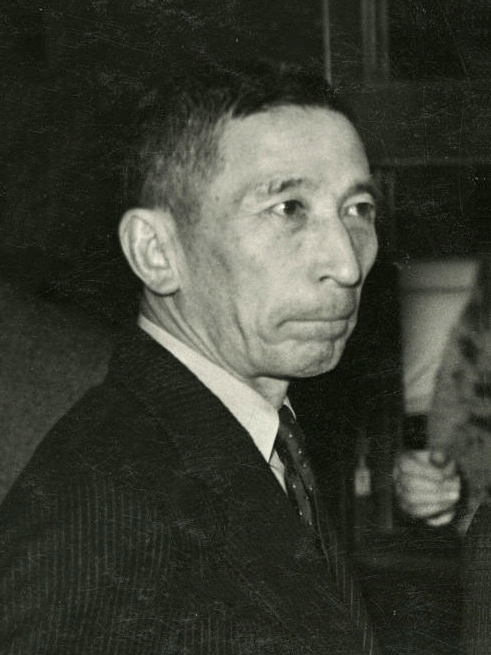

Mayor of Yokohama
- In office 23 April 1951 – 13 February 1959
- Preceded by: Kyōichi Ishikawa
- Succeeded by: Kiyoshi Nakarai

Personal details
- Born: 25 February 1879 Yokohama, Kanagawa, Japan
- Died: 13 February 1959 (aged 79) Shinjuku, Tokyo, Japan
- Education: Keio University

Ryōzō Hiranuma (平沼 亮三, Hiranuma Ryōzō; 25 February 1879 – 13 February 1959) was a Japanese politician who was the 5th President of the Japanese Olympic Committee from 1945 to 1946, and mayor of Yokohama from 1951 to 1959.

== Biography ==
Hiranuma was born in Yokohama on 25 February 1879. He studied at Keio University, where he played for their baseball team.

He died in Tokyo on 13 February 1959.

Political offices
Preceded by Kyōichi Ishikawa	Mayor of Yokohama; 1951–1959	Succeeded by Kiyoshi Nakarai
Sporting positions
New title	President of the Japan Association of Athletics Federations; 1929–1958	Succeeded by Hiromu Kasuga
New title	President of the Japan Gymnastics Association; 1929–1961	Succeeded by Kikuo Mihashi
Preceded by Hiroshi Shimomura	President of the Japanese Olympic Committee; 1945–1946	Succeeded by Ryotaro Azuma
Preceded by Hiroshi Shimomura	Chairman of the Japan Amateur Athletic Association; 1946	Succeeded by Ryotaro Azuma
Business positions
Preceded by Suekichi Nakagawa	Chairman of the Yokohama Chamber of Commerce and Industry; 1946	Succeeded by Yōzō Nomura
Preceded by Yōzō Nomura	Chairman of the Yokohama Chamber of Commerce and Industry; 1950–1951	Succeeded by Zenzaburō Hara
