= Japan Association of Athletics Federations =

Japanese governing body for the sport of athletics

- 日本陸上競技連盟
- Sport: Athletics
- Abbreviation: JAAF
- Founded: 1925
- Affiliation: World Athletics
- Regional affiliation: Asian Athletics Association (AAA)
- Headquarters: Tokyo
- President: Mitsugi Ogata

Official website
- www.jaaf.or.jp
- (Japan)

The Japan Association of Athletics Federations (日本陸上競技連盟, Nihon Rikujō Kyōgi Renmei) is the national governing body for the sport of athletics in Japan.

== Presidents ==
- Ryōzō Hiranuma (1929–1958)
- Hiroshi Kasuga (1958–1964)
- Ichirō Kōno (1965)
- Kenzō Kōno (1965–1975)
- Hanji Aoki (1975–1999)
- Yōhei Kōno (1999–2013)
- Hiroshi Yokokawa (2013–2021)
- Mitsugi Ogata (2021–2025)
- Yuko Arimori (2025– )

== Kit suppliers ==
Japan's kits are currently supplied by Asics.

== Competitions ==
- IAAF World Athletics Tour Osaka Meeting
- Japan Championships in Athletics
- National High School Championships in Athletics
- National High School Ekiden
- Japan Junior Championships in Athletics
- Tokyo Marathon
- Yokohama Women's Marathon
- Nagoya International Women's Marathon
- Osaka International Women's Marathon
- Fukuoka International Marathon Championship
- Biwako Mainichi Marathon
- International Chiba Ekiden
- Fukuoka International Cross Country Meet
- Chiba International Cross Country Championships

== See also ==
- 1991 World Championships in Athletics
- 2007 World Championships in Athletics
- 2006 IAAF World Cross Country Championships
- 1999 IAAF World Indoor Championships
