= Cordano Russell =

Canadian skateboarder (born 2004)

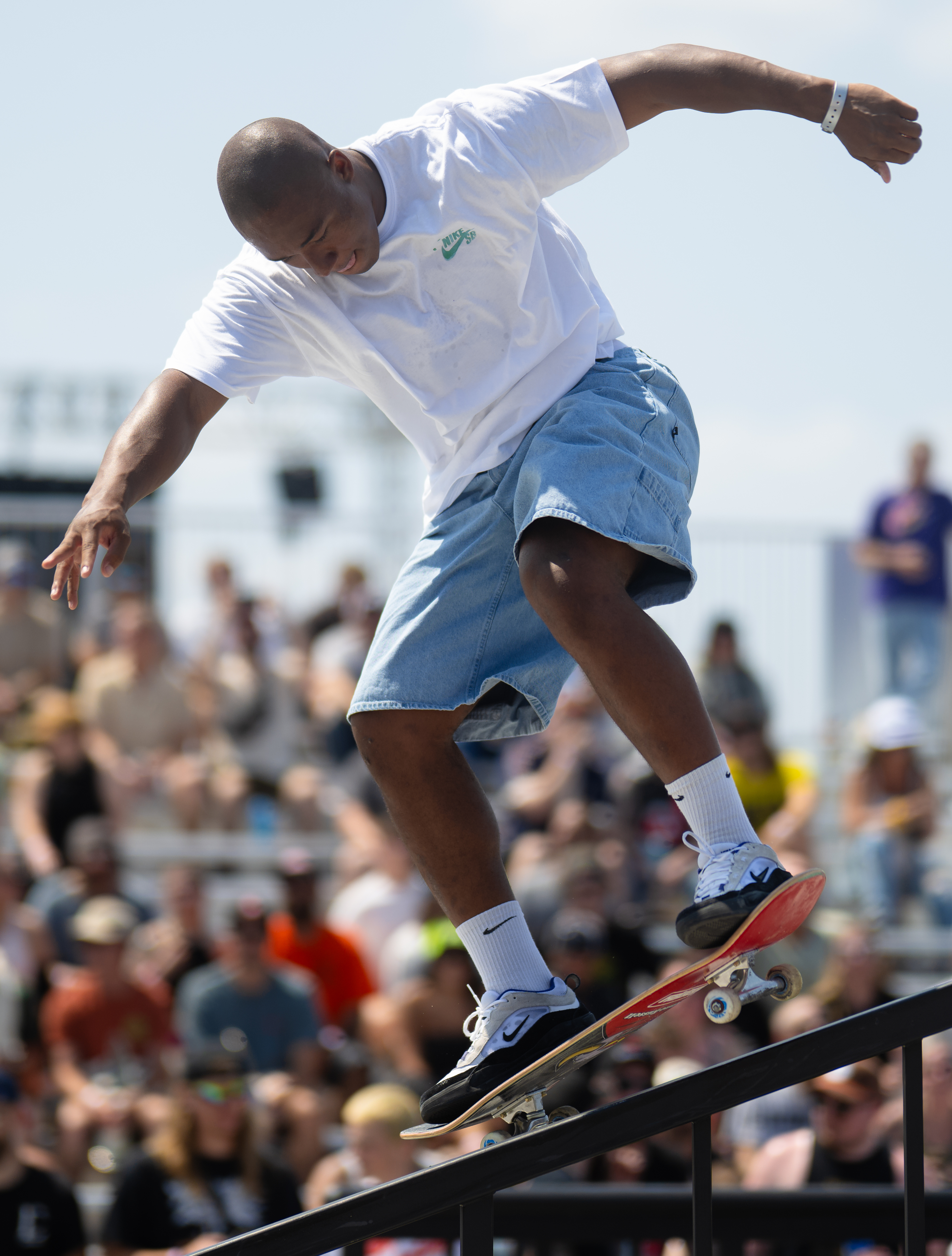
- Russell during a 2025 Street League Skateboarding event

Personal information
- Born: August 4, 2004 (age 22) London, Ontario, Canada
- Height: 6 ft 4 in (193 cm)
- Weight: 232 lb (105 kg)

Sport
- Sport: Skateboarding
- Rank: 16th – street (August 2024)
Medal record
Men's Skateboarding
Representing Canada

Cordano Russell (born August 4, 2004) is a Canadian skateboarder competing in the street discipline.

== Early life ==
Russell knew at the age of three he wanted to compete in skateboarding. At the age of four Russell and family moved to St.Louis, Missouri, United States. At the age of eight, Russell asked his parents to move to California, where the sport of skateboarding was more prominent. Russell lived in Carlsbad, California, United States as of July 2024. He also competed in football at Carlsbad High School.

== Career ==
At the 2023 World Skateboarding Championship in Tokyo, Japan, Russell finished fourth in the men's street event. In July 2024, Russell was named to Canada's 2024 Olympic team.

== Personal life ==
As of July 2024, Russell planned to attend University of San Diego majoring in business finance beginning in the fall of 2025. He is a dual citizen of the United States and Canada.
