= Dizzy bat =

Drinking game

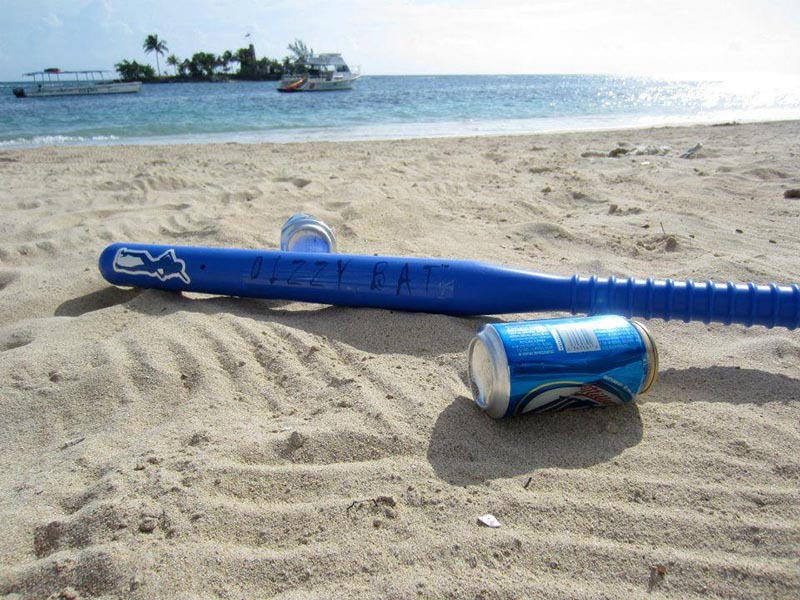
A commercially available dizzy bat

Dizzy bat (also known as Louisville chugger, D-bat, and The Spins) is a drinking game in which the participant chugs a full beer out of the holding end of a Wiffle ball bat. While the person is chugging, the surrounding participants count off in seconds how long it takes for the person to finish the full beer. The other players cannot stop shouting numbers until the batter turns the bat upside down to prove that every last drop has been consumed.

The participant must then lean over and spin around with their forehead placed on the end of the bat for however long it took to finish chugging. Once the participant has finished spinning, another person tosses the empty beer can in the air, and the participant must hit the can with the Wiffle ball bat. If the participant misses the can, they must spin an additional three times and try again to hit it again.

== Venues ==
Dizzy bat is commonly played at parties, colleges and universities, bars, and other drinking festivities such as a tailgate party at sporting events and concerts.

== Game variants ==
"Team Dizzy Bat" is a variation of the simpler dizzy bat drinking game, in which there are two even teams with two bats competing against each other in a relay race, with the bats acting as the baton. Each team splits into two even groups, facing each other about fifteen yards apart with both bats starting on the same side. Instead of the participants drinking a full beer from the inside of the Wiffle ball bat, they must drink a full beer (can, cup, or bottle), then spin around ten times, run over to their other group, and pass the bat to next player. Whichever team finishes first is the winner.

== Dizzy bats ==
Participants in the game of dizzy bat use any number of plastic, hollowed bats. Players can create their own bat using a standard Wiffle Ball Bat by removing the handle end to create an opening and punching a hole on the bat end to create air flow. Alternatively, players can purchase one of the commercially available bats, such as "The Dizzy Bat".

== See also ==
- List of drinking games
