= Japan Swimming Federation =

Sports governing body in Japan

Japan Swimming Federation 日本水泳連盟, Nihon Suiei Renmei
- Sport: Water polo, swimming, synchronized swimming, diving
- Abbreviation: JASF
- Founded: 1924
- Affiliation: International Swimming Federation (FINA); Asia Swimming Federation (AASF)
- Headquarters: Tokyo, Japan
- Location: Japan Sport Olympic Square
- President: Tsuyoshi Aoki

Official website
- www.swim.or.jp
- (Japan)

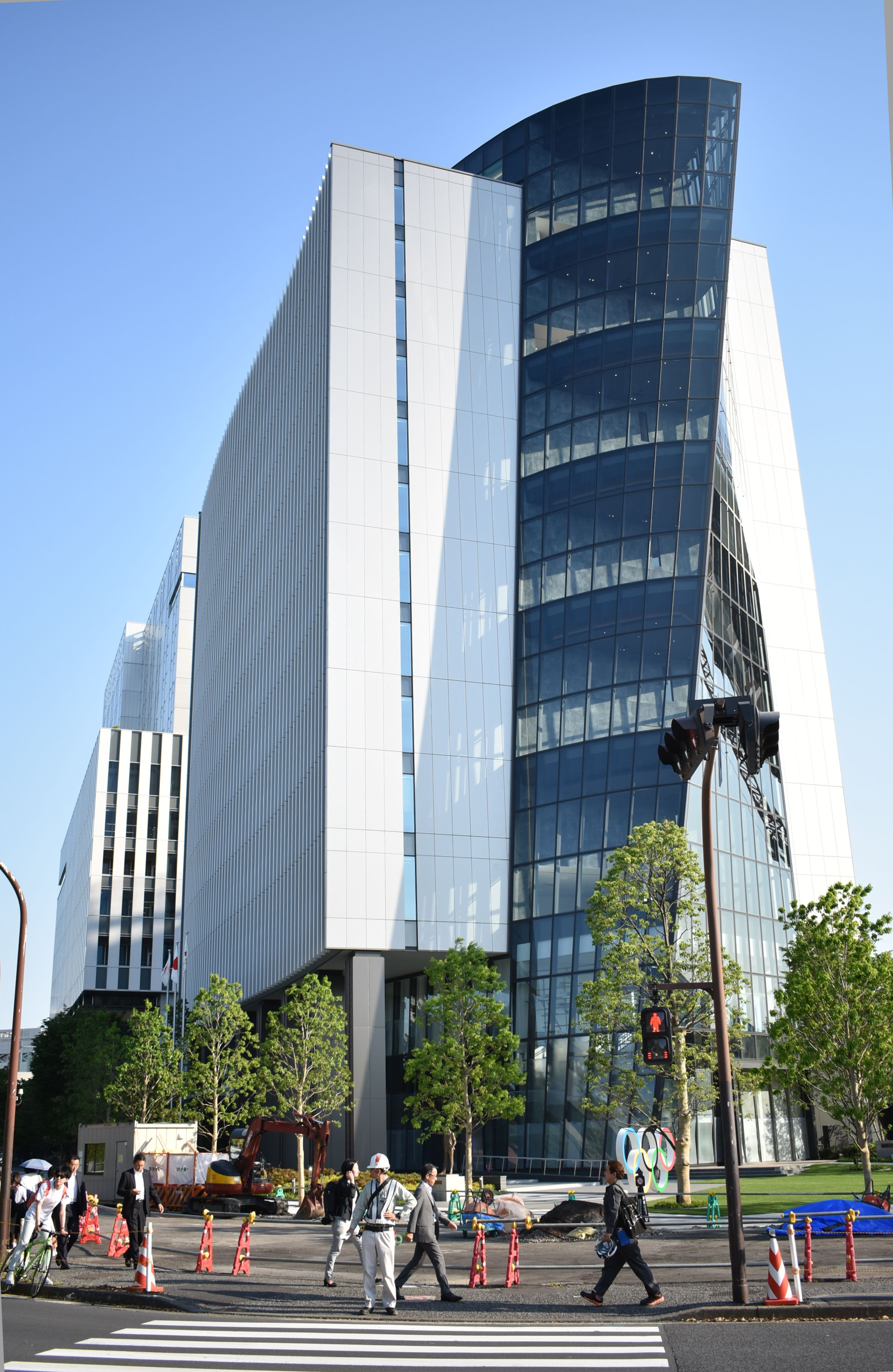
Headquarters at Japan Sport Olympic Square in Tokyo

The Japan Swimming Federation (日本水泳連盟, Nihon Suiei Renmei; JASF), is the national federation for Aquatics in Japan. It oversees Japan's Swimming, Diving, Water Polo and Synchronized Swimming competitive programs. It was founded on October 31, 1924. It is affiliated to World Aquatics, the Asia Swimming Federation, the Japanese Olympic Committee and the Japan Amateur Sports Association.

== Presidents ==
Name	Year
Izutaro Suehiro	1927 – 1947
Masaji Tabata	1948 – 1957
Kazushige Higuchi	1958 – 1960
Katsuo Takaishi	1961 – 1964
Ryo Okuno	1965 – 1972
Akira Fujita	1973 – 1984
Hironoshin Furuhashi	1985 – 2002
Toshihiro Hayashi	2003–2008
Kazuo Sano	2009 – 2012
Daichi Suzuki	2013 – 2014
Tsuyoshi Aoki	2015–present

== Championships ==
- Japan Swimming Championships (50m)
- Japan Swimming Championships (25m)
- Japan Diving Cup
- Japan Open (Swimming)
- Japan Open (synchronized swimming)
- Japan College Aquatics Championships
- Japan High School Aquatics Championships
- Japan Junior High School Aquatics Championships
- JOC Junior Olympic Cup

== See also ==
- (in Japanese) website: www.swim.or.jp
- Tokyo Tatsumi International Swimming Center
