= Beach Flags (sport) =

Sport played on a beach

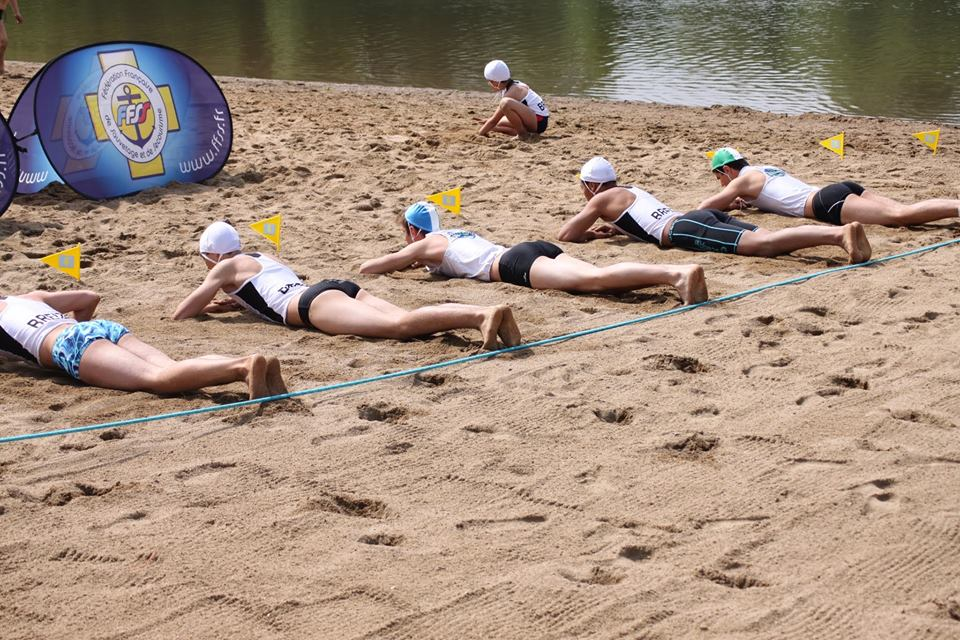
- Competitors in the starting position.

Presence
- Country or region: Australia
- Olympic: No
- Paralympic: No

Beach Flags is a sporting event used by surf lifesavers to practice beach sprinting and reflexes.

The game is played by sticking a series of flags (typically short lengths of hosepipe) into the sand in a row. The competitors lie facing away (and face down) approximately 20 metres away. Upon a starting signal, the competitors race to the flags and try to grab one. The difficulty in the sport is that there are always fewer flags than there are competitors. The competitors who do not manage to capture a flag are eliminated, the flags are reset (removing one more), and the game continues until there is one person remaining - the winner. The game progresses in much the same way as musical chairs. Competitors are also eliminated if they commit a starting infringement by moving between the "heads down heads up" and starting signal usually a horn or just someone yelling go.

The event involves a tactical component as competitors have discretion as to which flag they obtain. While there is a degree of jostling, a competitor can be disqualified for deliberately impeding another competitor. Rather than testing endurance and stamina, the event tests power and reflexes. A round run by Open Australian national finalists will take approximately 3.7 seconds.
