= List of Sasuke competitions =

The following is a list of competitors who have managed to reach at least the second stage in each competition of Sasuke and also number of competitors who failed to finish the first stage. The results are listed according to who went furthest, along with the obstacle and stage they failed to complete. In the 10th competition, the number system ran from 901–1000 to indicate that 1000 attempts have been made to complete the first stage; in the 20th competition, it ran from 1901–2000 to indicate that 2000 attempts have been made to complete the first stage. In the 30th competition, it ran from 2901–3000 to indicate that 3000 attempts have been made to complete the first stage; then in the 40th competition, it ran from 3901-4000 to indicate that 4000 attempts have been made to complete the first stage.

== Legend ==
The competitor achieved Total Victory.
The competitor is female.
The competitor was injured while or before performing the obstacle.
The competitor was disqualified.

== 1st competition ==
Aired: September 27, 1997 ^{†}

Competitor	Stage	Obstacle
No. 97 Akira Omori	Final	Failed Final Rope 11 Meters Up
No. 49 Takayuki Kawashima	Final	Failed Final Rope 10 Meters Up
No. 96 Ken Hasegawa	Final	Failed Final Rope 8 Meters Up
No. 72 Takashi Yo	Final	Failed Final Rope 8 meters Up
No. 89 Kane Kosugi	Third	Failed Pole Bridge
No. 18 Yoshihito Yamamoto	Third	Failed Pole Bridge
No. 78 Kazuhiro Sugimoto	Second	Failed Wall Lifting
No. 54 Hidekazu Miyagi	Second	Failed Wall Lifting
No. 94 Yukio Iketani	Second	Failed Hammer Dodge
No. 92 Katsumi Yamada	Second	Failed Hammer Dodge
No. 90 Hisaya Satō	Second	Failed Hammer Dodge
No. 59 Toyohisa Iijima	Second	Failed Hammer Dodge
No. 40 Eiichi Miura	Second	Failed Hammer Dodge
No. 22 Takashi Sakamoto	Second	Failed Hammer Dodge
No. 7 Shingo Yamamoto	Second	Failed Hammer Dodge
No. 31 Yuusuke Ōta	Second	Failed Moving Walls
No. 25 Kazuo Wakae	Second	Failed Moving Walls
No. 2 Shinichi Yano	Second	Failed Moving Walls
No. 88 Kiyomi Inoue	Second	Failed Spider Walk
No. 76 Naoto Amano	Second	Failed
No. 64 Tomohiro Tada	Second	Failed
No. 47 Motoharu Araki	Second	Failed
No. 43 Shuichirō Koyama	Second	Failed
76 competitors	First	Failed

^{†} First and only competition to be held indoors at Tokyo Bay NK Hall.

== 2nd competition ==
Aired: September 26, 1998

Competitor	Stage	Obstacle
No. 97 Hikaru Tanaka	Final	Failed Final Rope 12 Meters Up
No. 99 Akira Omori	Final	Failed Final Rope 7.8 Meters Up
No. 95 Shigeyuki Nakamura	Third	Failed Pipe Slider
No. 83 Hiroaki Yoshizaki	Third	Failed Pipe Slider
No. 70 Masakazu Ebihara	Third	Disqualified on Pipe Slider ^{†}
No. 65 Ken Hasegawa	Third	Failed Pipe Slider
No. 42 Tatsuya Yamamoto	Third	Failed Pipe Slider
No. 30 Eiichi Miura	Third	Failed Pipe Slider
No. 20 Shingo Yamamoto	Third	Failed Pipe Slider
No. 100 Kazuhiko Akiyama	Second	Failed Wall Lifting Run
No. 93 Nozomu Tomishima	Second	Failed Wall Lifting Run
No. 88 Shane Kosugi	Second	Failed Wall Lifting Run
No. 39 Yoshihide Tanigawa	Second	Failed Wall Lifting Run
No. 2 Takuyu Ueda	Second	Failed Wall Lifting Run
No. 76 Takashi Yō	Second	Failed Hammer Dodge
No. 64 Gōsuke Yokoyama	Second	Failed Hammer Dodge
No. 43 Yoshihito Yamamoto	Second	Failed Hammer Dodge
No. 91 Katsumi Yamada	Second	Failed Spider Climb
No. 84 Hiroyuki Satō	Second	Failed Spider Climb
No. 57 Kazufumi Kimura	Second	Failed Spider Climb
No. 19 Hiroyuki Amano	Second	Failed Spider Climb
No. 18 Naoto Amano	Second	Failed Spider Climb
No. 11 Takashi Sakamoto	Second	Failed Spider Climb
No. 3 Yūji Suzuki	Second	Failed Spider Climb
No. 56 Yūji Okumura	Second	Failed Spider Walk
No. 41 Chie Tanabe	Second	Failed Spider Walk
No. 66 Toshitaka Ishihara	Second	Failed
No. 59 Kōichi Tamura	Second	Failed
No. 48 Andrea Komatsubara	Second	Failed
No. 35 Toru Takahashi	Second	Failed
No. 32 Seigo Shibada	Second	Failed
No. 23 Yoshiharu Itō	Second	Failed
No. 9 Hideki Naruo	Second	Failed
No. 5 Keiji Udagawa	Second	Failed
66 competitors	First	Failed

^{†} Ebihara pushed one side of the pipe harder than the other, causing the pipe to fall off the tracks.

== 3rd competition ==
Aired: March 13, 1999

Competitor	Stage	Obstacle
No. 89 Katsumi Yamada	Final	Failed Final Rope 14.5 Meters Up
No. 13 Shingo Yamamoto	Final	Failed Final Rope 12 Meters Up
No. 49 Minoru Matsumoto	Final	Failed Final Rope 8 Meters Up
No. 100 Akira Omori	Final	Failed Final Rope 8 Meters Up
No. 54 Tatsuya Yamamoto	Final	Failed Final Rope 8 Meters Up
No. 10 Ken Hasegawa	Third	Failed Pipe Slider
No. 99 Kazuhiko Akiyama	Second	Failed Wall Lifting Run
No. 69 Junpei Morita	Second	Failed Wall Lifting Run
No. 34 Hiroyuki Asaoka	Second	Failed Hammer Dodge
No. 81 Tadao Itō	Second	Failed Moving Walls
No. 98 Yasutoshi Kujirai	Second	Failed Spider Walk
No. 17 Masaaki Tateyama	Second	Failed Spider Walk
No. 72 Haruhisa Miyazawa	Second	Failed Spider Walk
87 competitors	First	Failed

== 4th competition ==
Aired: October 16, 1999

Competitor	Stage	Obstacle
No. 86 Kazuhiko Akiyama	Final	Total Victory (6.0 seconds to spare)
No. 40 Eiichi Miura	Third	Failed Pipe Slider
No. 3 Hiroyuki Asaoka	Third	Failed Pipe Slider
No. 81 Naoki Iketani	Third	Failed Pipe Slider^{†}
No. 94 Travis Allen Schroeder	Third	Disqualified on Pipe Slider ^{††}
No. 100 Katsumi Yamada	Third	Failed Cliff Hanger
No. 97 Kane Kosugi	Third	Failed Cliff Hanger
No. 95 Hiroaki Yoshizaki	Third	Failed Cliff Hanger
No. 71 Takuyu Ueda	Third	Failed Cliff Hanger
No. 43 Takayuki Kawashima	Third	Failed Cliff Hanger
No. 64 Shusuke Satō	Third	Failed Pole Jump
No. 1 Ichirō Atarashi	Second	Failed Reverse Conveyor
No. 82 Tadao Itō	Second	Failed Hammer Dodge
No. 55 Shigenori Kobayashi	Second	Failed Hammer Dodge
No. 20 Kenichi Yoshida	Second	Failed Hammer Dodge
No. 79 Katsushige Fukushima	Second	Failed Spider Climb
No. 78 Takuji Araki	Second	Failed Spider Climb
No. 70 Masato Kondo	Second	Failed Spider Climb
No. 91 Tadanori Fukayama	Second	Failed Moving Walls
No. 93 Masashi Saeki	Second	Failed Spider Walk
No. 77 Norihito Eda	Second	Failed Spider Walk
No. 76 Hiroyuki Nagahama	Second	Failed Spider Walk
No. 56 Takashi Yamauchi	Second	Failed Spider Walk
No. 53 Takashi Hashidate	Second	Failed Spider Walk
No. 52 Shinji Matsushima	Second	Failed Spider Walk
No. 47 Ken Nakata	Second	Failed Spider Walk
No. 87 Taka Satō	Second	Failed
No. 75 Susumu Shigeno	Second	Failed
No. 73 Kōichi Kanzaki	Second	Failed
No. 65 Junpei Morita	Second	Failed
No. 54 Ryūgo Suzuka	Second	Failed
No. 48 Kenichi Ishijima	Second	Failed
No. 45 Masao Nishihama	Second	Failed
No. 35 Haruo Takimoto	Second	Failed
No. 28 Shinichi Aizawa	Second	Failed
No. 22 Munetaka Miyazawa	Second	Failed
No. 14 Hiroaki Takemoto	Second	Failed
63 competitors	First	Failed

^{†} Iketani tried to rest by putting his foot on a sliding pole and fell.
^{††} When Schroeder tried to get the pipe across the tracks, he pushed one side harder than the other, causing it to fall off the tracks.

== 5th competition ==
Aired: March 18, 2000

Competitor	Stage	Obstacle
No. 98 Shingo Yamamoto	Third	Failed Pipe Slider
No. 100 Katsumi Yamada	Second	Failed Spider Walk
No. 74 Toshihiro Takeda	Second	Failed Spider Walk
97 competitors	First	Failed

== 6th competition ==
Aired: September 9, 2000

Competitor	Stage	Obstacle
No. 99 Katsumi Yamada	Third	Disqualified on Pipe Slider ^{†}
No. 83 Yoshiaki Hatakeda	Third	Failed Cliff Hanger
No. 93 Toshihiro Takeda	Third	Failed Body Prop
No. 98 Kane Kosugi	Third	Failed Body Prop
No. 97 Shane Kosugi	Third	Failed Body Prop
95 competitors	First	Failed

^{†} Yamada cleared the Pipe Slider, but after the landing he fell sideways off the mat.

Note: All five competitors who cleared the First Stage also cleared the Second Stage.

== 7th competition ==
Aired: March 17, 2001

Competitor	Stage	Obstacle
No. 97 Shingo Yamamoto	Final	Failed Spider Climb (injured) ^{†}
No. 46 Kenji Takahashi	Third	Failed Cliff Hanger
No. 40 Hironori Kuboki	Third	Failed Cliff Hanger
No. 81 Shane Kosugi	Third	Failed Body Prop
No. 95 James Okada	Third	Failed Propeller Bars
No. 98 Kane Kosugi	Second	Failed Spider Walk
No. 88 Katsumi Yoshinaga	Second	Failed Chain Reaction
No. 54 Kozo Akimoto	Second	Failed Chain Reaction
92 competitors	First	Failed

^{†} Yamamoto climbed two and a half meters before slipping and dislocating his shoulder, falling to the safety mats below.

== 8th competition ==
Aired: September 29, 2001

Competitor	Stage	Obstacle
No. 91 Kane Kosugi	Final	Failed Final Rope 18 Meters Up
No. 59 Jordan Jovtchev	Final	Failed Spider Climb 11.5 Meters Up^{†}
No. 71 Toshihiro Takeda	Third	Failed Pipe Slider
No. 81 Shōei	Third	Failed Body Prop
No. 46 Daisuke Nakata	Second	Failed Wall Lifting
No. 62 Ryuichi Sagawa	Second	Disqualified on Chain Reaction ^{††}
94 competitors	First	Failed

^{†} Jovtchev fell off the Spider Climb after the walls split at the 15 second limit.
^{††} Sakawa landed on the mat from the Chain Reaction, but as he landed, his foot touched the water, resulting in immediate disqualification.

== 9th competition ==
Aired: March 16, 2002

Competitor	Stage	Obstacle
No. 61 Makoto Nagano	Third	Failed Pipe Slider
No. 97 Toshihiro Takeda	Third	Failed Lamp Grasper
No. 71 Daisuke Nakata	Third	Failed Lamp Grasper
No. 98 Shingo Yamamoto	Third	Failed Rumbling Dice
No. 99 Katsumi Yamada	Second	Failed Wall Lifting^{†}
No. 81 Naoki Iketani	Second	Failed Wall Lifting ^{††}
No. 41 Kinnikun Nakayama	Second	Failed Spider Walk
93 competitors	First	Failed

^{†} Yamada spent about 20 seconds in front of the spider walk peeling off the duct tape that had been preapplied to his feet to prevent slipping due to the dust.
^{††} When Naoki Iketani cleared the Reverse Conveyor, time was expired before he could attempt the Wall Lifting.

== 10th competition ==
Aired: September 25, 2002

Competitor	Stage	Obstacle
No. 1000 Katsumi Yamada	Third	Failed Pipe Slider
No. 961 Naoki Iketani	Third	Failed Cliff Hanger
No. 940 Daisuke Nakata	Third	Failed Lamp Grasper
No. 954 Hiroyuki Asaoka	Third	Failed Body Prop
No. 978 Kenichi Arai	Second	Failed Spider Walk
95 competitors	First	Failed

== 11th competition ==
Aired: March 21, 2003

Competitor	Stage	Obstacle
No. 96 Makoto Nagano	Final	Failed Final Rope 20 Meters Up
No. 74 Shinji Kobayashi	Third	Failed Pipe Slider
No. 98 Shingo Yamamoto	Third	Failed Cliff Hanger
No. 61 Naoki Iketani	Third	Failed Cliff Hanger
No. 95 Daisuke Nakata	Third	Failed Lamp Grasper
No. 97 Toshihiro Takeda	Third	Failed Body Prop
No. 99 Kazuhiko Akiyama	Third	Failed Body Prop
No. 41 Kinnikun Nakayama	Second	Failed Wall Lifting ^{†}
No. 66 Bunpei Shiratori	Second	Failed Wall Lifting
No. 100 Katsumi Yamada	Second	Failed Balance Tank
No. 58 Hiroyuki Asaoka	Second	Failed Chain Reaction
89 competitors	First	Failed

^{†} Nakayama cleared the Wall Lift, but hit the red button a split-second too late.

== 12th competition ==
Aired: October 1, 2003

Competitor	Stage	Obstacle
No. 100 Makoto Nagano	Final	Failed Final Rope (0.11 seconds late)
No. 77 Bunpei Shiratori	Final	Failed Final Rope 21 meters Up
No. 72 Hiroyuki Asaoka	Final	Failed Final Rope 20 meters Up
No. 95 Toshihiro Takeda	Third	Failed Pipe Slider
No. 97 Kazuhiko Akiyama	Third	Failed Pipe Slider
No. 99 Jordan Jovtchev	Third	Failed Cliff Hanger
No. 96 Shingo Yamamoto	Third	Failed Cliff Hanger
No. 70 Manabu Sato	Third	Failed Cliff Hanger
No. 1 Koji Yamada	Third	Failed Cliff Hanger
No. 92 Masaaki Kobayashi	Third	Failed Body Prop
No. 98 Katsumi Yamada	Second	Disqualified on Spider Walk ^{†}
89 competitors	First	Failed

^{†} Yamada cleared the second stage, but was disqualified for using his gloves on the Spider Walk.

== 13th competition ==
Aired: April 6, 2004

Competitor	Stage	Obstacle
No. 100 Makoto Nagano	Final	Failed Final Rope 22.4 Meters Up
No. 99 Bunpei Shiratori	Third	Failed Pipe Slider
No. 98 Toshihiro Takeda	Third	Failed Cliff Hanger
No. 97 Masaaki Kobayashi	Third	Failed Curtain Cling
No. 90 Naoki Iketani	Third	Failed Body Prop
No. 76 Shingo Yamamoto	Second	Failed Wall Lifting
No. 87 Kosuke Yamaguchi	Second	Failed Wall Lifting
No. 71 Daisuke Nakata	Second	Failed Wall Lifting
No. 38 Shigenori Ueki	Second	Failed Reverse Conveyor
No. 75 Hideaki Shimizu	Second	Failed Balance Tank
90 competitors	First	Failed

== 14th competition ==
Aired: January 4, 2005

Competitor	Stage	Obstacle
No. 68 Shinji Kobayashi	Third	Failed Devil's Swing ^{†}
No. 100 Makoto Nagano	Third	Failed Jumping Bars
No. 97 Toshihiro Takeda	Third	Failed Cliff Hanger
No. 91 Jordan Jovtchev	Third	Failed Cliff Hanger
No. 80 Hiroyuki Asaoka	Third	Failed Cliff Hanger
No. 98 Shingo Yamamoto	Third	Failed Curtain Cling
No. 81 Naoki Iketani	Third	Failed Body Prop
No. 87 Masaaki Kobayashi	Third	Failed Body Prop
No. 76 Terukazu Ishikawa	Third	Failed Body Prop
No. 88 Kosuke Yamaguchi	Third	Failed Rumbling Dice
No. 83 Paul Hamm	Second	Disqualified on Wall Lifting ^{††}
No. 67 Shunsuke Nagasaki	Second	Failed Wall Lifting
No. 96 Bunpei Shiratori	Second	Failed Balance Tank
No. 89 Motoshi Kitaya	Second	Failed Chain Reaction
86 competitors	First	Failed

^{†} At the end of the Devil's Swing Kobayashi tried to grab the bar of the Pipe Slider, but he missed and the bar moved too far away from him. Although he continued to swing, he was unable to get through that gap and he fell.
^{††} Hamm cleared the Wall Lift as time ran out, but forgot to hit the red button as he burst through the gates, and was disqualified.

== 15th competition ==
Aired: July 20, 2005

Competitor	Stage	Obstacle
No. 96 Toshihiro Takeda	Third	Failed Devil's Swing
No. 94 Bunpei Shiratori ^{†}	Third	Failed Climbing Bars
No. 70 Koji Yamada	Third	Failed Jumping Bars
No. 65 Shunsuke Nagasaki	Third	Failed Cliff Hanger
No. 93 Morgan Hamm	Third	Failed Curtain Cling
No. 95 Shingo Yamamoto	Third	Failed Body Prop
No. 100 Makoto Nagano	Second	Failed Metal Spin
93 competitors	First	Failed

^{†} Bunpei Shiratori was the last competitor to attempt the first stage due to suffering from heat exhaustion.

== 16th competition ==
Aired: December 30, 2005

Competitor	Stage	Obstacle
No. 96 Bunpei Shiratori	Third	Failed Pipe Slider
No. 91 Koji Yamada	Third	Failed Pipe Slider
No. 100 Makoto Nagano	Third	Failed Devil's Swing ^{†}
No. 98 Toshihiro Takeda	Third	Failed Cliff Hanger
No. 95 Jordan Jovtchev	Third	Failed Cliff Hanger
No. 89 Shunsuke Nagasaki	Third	Failed Cliff Hanger
No. 66 Kenji Takahashi	Third	Failed Cliff Hanger
No. 90 Naoki Iketani	Third	Failed Body Prop
No. 94 Paul Hamm	Second	Failed Metal Spin
No. 93 Masaaki Kobayashi	Second	Failed Metal Spin
No. 92 Shinji Kobayashi	Second	Failed Metal Spin
No. 73 Masashi Kameyama	Second	Failed Metal Spin
No. 71 Kazuhiko Akiyama	Second	Failed Metal Spin
No. 51 Tomoyuki	Second	Failed Metal Spin
No. 39 Hidenori Nagasawa	Second	Failed Metal Spin
No. 86 Yūta Izumiyama	Second	Failed Delta Bridge
84 competitors	First	Failed

^{†} When Nagano tried to grab the Pipe Slider bar from the Devil's Swing, he lost his grip on the bar and it slid far away from him. Thus, he was unable to reach the Pipe Slider when he jumped for it and he fell into the water.

== 17th competition ==
Aired: October 11, 2006

Competitor	Stage	Obstacle
No. 99 Makoto Nagano	Final	Total Victory (2.56 seconds to spare)
No. 87 Shunsuke Nagasaki	Final	Failed Final Rope 18 meters Up
No. 91 Toshihiro Takeda	Third	Failed Pipe Slider
No. 86 Paul Terek	Third	Failed Cliff Hanger
No. 67 Yuta Adachi	Third	Failed Body Prop
No. 81 Bunpei Shiratori	Third	Failed Body Prop
No. 98 Shingo Yamamoto	Third	Failed Body Prop
No. 96 Daisuke Nakata	Third	Failed Arm Rings
No. 95 Koji Yamada	Second	Failed Metal Spin
No. 92 Li En-Chi	Second	Failed Metal Spin
No. 51 Kota Honma	Second	Failed Spider Walk
89 competitors	First	Failed

== 18th competition ==
Aired: March 21, 2007

Competitor	Stage	Obstacle
No. 96 Makoto Nagano	Third	Disqualified on Shin-Cliff Hanger ^{†}
No. 97 Shunsuke Nagasaki	Third	Failed Shin-Cliff Hanger
No. 98 Kenji Takahashi	Third	Failed Shin-Cliff Hanger
No. None^{††} Toshihiro Takeda	Second	Failed Salmon Ladder
No. 60 Takamasa Nagasaki	Second	Failed Salmon Ladder
No. 70 Yuji Washimi	Second	Failed Salmon Ladder
94 competitors	First	Failed

^{†} When Nagano crossed the second gap of the Cliff Hanger, he grabbed the top of the frame with one hand, therefore going off the course. Nagano pointed out his mistake and allowed himself to be disqualified.
^{††} No number given; likely challenged between No.86 and No.87 .

Note: This competition, the rule was to take the numbers lined up at the finish line of the marathon on a first-come, first-served basis.

== 19th competition ==
Aired: September 19, 2007

Competitor	Stage	Obstacle
No. 79 Koji Yamada	Second	Failed Salmon Ladder
No. 86 Yuji Washimi	Second	Failed Salmon Ladder
98 competitors	First	Failed

Note: Only 2 competitors managed to clear the First Stage and neither managed to clear the Second Stage. like Kunoichi First competition only 2 competitors cleared first stage and failed in Second Stage too.

== 20th competition ==
Aired: March 26, 2008

Competitor	Stage	Obstacle
No. 1989 Levi Meeuwenberg	Third	Failed Shin-Cliff Hanger
No. 1924 Yoshiyuki Okuyama	Second	Failed Stick Slider
No. 2000 Makoto Nagano	Second	Failed Downhill Jump
97 competitors	First	Failed

== 21st competition ==
Aired: September 17, 2008

Competitor	Stage	Obstacle
No. 100 Makoto Nagano	Third	Failed Gliding Ring ^{†}
No. 98 Toshihiro Takeda	Third	Failed Hang Climbing
No. 97 Daisuke Miyazaki	Third	Failed Devil Steps
No. 49 Li En-Chi	Second	Failed Wall Lifting
No. 99 Levi Meeuwenberg	Second	Failed Salmon Ladder
No. 91 Tomohiro Matsunaga	Second	Failed Salmon Ladder
No. 75 Brian Orosco	Second	Failed Salmon Ladder
No. 88 Daisuke Nakata	Second	Failed Salmon Ladder
No. 83 Bunpei Shiratori	Second	Failed Downhill Jump
91 competitors	First	Failed

^{†}An error in design caused the ring to force down the track, causing Nagano to fail just as he managed to put the ring in the stopper.

== 22nd competition ==
Aired: March 30, 2009

Competitor	Stage	Obstacle
No. 77 Yuuji Urushihara	Final	Failed G-Rope 22.9 meters up
No. 49 Hitoshi Kanno	Third	Disqualified on Spider Flip ^{†}
No. 79 Li En-Chi	Third	Failed Shin-Cliff Hanger
No. 84 Yoshiyuki Okuyama	Third	Failed Shin-Cliff Hanger
No. 90 Hiromichi Sato	Second	Failed Metal Spin
95 competitors	First	Failed

^{†} When Kanno climbed the Spider Flip, he touched part of the frame with his foot and climbed along the side of the actual platform, therefore going off the course.

== 23rd competition ==
Aired: September 27, 2009

Competitor	Stage	Obstacle
No. 100 Makoto Nagano	Final	Failed G-Rope (0.21 seconds late)
No. 96 Hitoshi Kanno	Final	Failed G-Rope 18 Meters up
No. 84 Kenji Takahashi	Third	Failed Gliding Ring
No. 92 Yoshiyuki Okuyama	Third	Failed Spider Flip
No. 97 Toshihiro Takeda	Third	Failed Spider Flip
No. 95 Levi Meeuwenberg	Third	Failed Shin-Cliff Hanger
No. 93 Shingo Yamamoto	Third	Failed Arm Rings (injured)^{††}
No. 94 Li En Chi	Second	Failed Metal Spin
No. 99 Yuuji Urushihara	Second	Failed Unstable Bridge
No. 73 Brian Orosco	Second	Failed Unstable Bridge
No. 42 Richard King	Second	Failed Unstable Bridge
No. 53 Yoshiki Ito	Second	Failed Salmon Ladder
No. 49 Satoshi Nakamura	Second	Disqualified on Salmon Ladder ^{†††}
No. 45 Naoya Tajima	Second	Failed Salmon Ladder
No. 50 Jun Sato	Second	Failed Salmon Ladder
No. 47 Kouji Hashimoto	Second	Failed Salmon Ladder
84 competitors	First	Failed

^{†} Nagano was given a second run of the first stage because the Slider Jump failed to work properly.
^{††} While on the Arm Rings, Yamamoto's shoulder dislocated again, so he immediately dropped into the water.
^{†††} Nakamura was disqualified for using his foot to touch the frame of Salmon Ladder.

== 24th competition ==
Aired: January 1, 2010

Competitor	Stage	Obstacle
No. 93 Yuuji Urushihara	Final	Total Victory (3.57 seconds left)
No. 85 Kouji Hashimoto	Final	Failed G-Rope 22 meters up
No. 94 Kenji Takahashi	Final	Failed G-Rope 20 meters up^{†}
No. 95 Yoshiyuki Okuyama	Final	Failed G-Rope 19 Meters up
No. 92 Li En-Chi	Final	Failed G-Rope 18 meters Up
No. 73 Naoya Tajima	Third	Failed Gliding Ring^{††}
No. 98 Toshihiro Takeda	Third	Failed Spider Flip
No. 97 Hiromichi Sato	Second	Failed Metal Spin
No. 84 Yuji Washimi	Second	Failed Metal Spin
No. 64 Terukazu Ishikawa	Second	Failed Metal Spin
No. 47 Tomohiro Kawaguchi	Second	Failed Unstable Bridge
No. 78 Jun Sato	Second	Failed Salmon Ladder
88 competitors	First	Failed

^{†} Kenji twisted up the G-Rope and got the safety wire tangled, causing him to stop.
^{††} Tajima forgot to remove the ring stopper.

== 25th competition ==
Aired: March 28, 2010

Competitor	Stage	Obstacle
No. 80 Li En-Chi	Third	Failed Ultimate Cliff Hanger
No. 60 Kouji Hashimoto	Third	Failed Ultimate Cliff Hanger
No. 40 Kenji Takahashi	Third	Failed Ultimate Cliff Hanger
No. 50 Yoshiyuki Okuyama	Third	Failed Ultimate Cliff Hanger
No. 69 Brian Orosco	Third	Failed Doorknob Grasper
No. 90 Shingo Yamamoto	Second	Failed Balance Tank
No. 89 Hitoshi Kanno	Second	Failed Balance Tank
No. 18 Jun Sato	Second	Failed Unstable Bridge
No. 70 Toshihiro Takeda	Second	Failed Double Salmon Ladder
No. 100 Yuuji Urushihara	Second	Failed Double Salmon Ladder ^{†}
No. 48 Levi Meeuwenberg	Second	Failed Slider Drop
89 competitors	First	Failed

^{†} Urushihara touched the water with his foot.

Note: This competition, Numbers were determined by lottery, but certain numbers were assigned to leading players.

== 26th competition ==
Aired: January 2, 2011

Competitor	Stage	Obstacle
No. 95 Li En-Chi	Third	Failed Ultimate Cliff Hanger
No. 97 Yoshiyuki Okuyama	Third	Failed Ultimate Cliff Hanger
No. 84 David Campbell	Third	Failed Ultimate Cliff Hanger
No. 74 Brent Steffensen	Third	Failed Ultimate Cliff Hanger
No. 61 Paul Kasemir	Third	Failed Doorknob Grasper
No. 92 Brian Orosco	Third	Failed Roulette Cylinder
No. 98 Kouji Hashimoto	Second	Failed Metal Spin
No. 82 Travis Furlanic	Second	Failed Balance Tank
No. 87 Naoki Iketani	Second	Failed Double Salmon Ladder
No. 85 Terukazu Ishikawa	Second	Failed Double Salmon Ladder
90 competitors	First	Failed

== 27th Competition ==
Aired: October 3, 2011

Competitor	Stage	Obstacle
No. 99 Yuuji Urushihara	Final	Total Victory (6.71 seconds left)
No. 62 Ryo Matachi	Final	Failed Final Rope 18.8 meters up
No. 20 Kouji Hashimoto	Third	Failed Chain See-Saw
No. 98 David Campbell	Third	Failed Ultimate Cliff Hanger
No. 100 Makoto Nagano	Third	Failed Ultimate Cliff Hanger
No. 89 Paul Kasemir	Third	Failed Ultimate Cliff Hanger
No. 57 James McGrath	Third	Failed Ultimate Cliff Hanger
No. 63 Ryan Stratis	Third	Failed Ultimate Cliff Hanger
No. 96 Yoshiyuki Okuyama	Third	Failed Flying Bar
No. 87 Terukazu Ishikawa	Third	Failed Flying Bar
No. 90 Ryouma Kato	Second	Failed Metal Spin
No. 84 Yusuke Morimoto	Second	Failed Metal Spin
No. 79 Brent Steffensen	Second	Failed Metal Spin
No. 71 Travis Furlanic	Second	Failed Metal Spin
No. 60 Travis Rosen	Second	Failed Metal Spin
No. 6 Daisuke Morikami	Second	Failed Metal Spin
No. 93 Naoki Iketani	Second	Failed Double Salmon Ladder
No. 92 Wakky	Second	Failed Double Salmon Ladder
No. 85 Naoki Yokoyama	Second	Failed Double Salmon Ladder
No. 65 Yousuke Kaneko	Second	Failed Double Salmon Ladder
No. 56 Yuuya Kadono	Second	Failed Double Salmon Ladder
No. 55 Kazuma Asa	Second	Failed Double Salmon Ladder
No. 51 Jacob Smith	Second	Failed Double Salmon Ladder
No. 1 Hitoshi Kanno	Second	Failed Double Salmon Ladder (injured) ^{†}
No. 70 Hidetsugu Setoda	Second	Failed Slider Drop
No. 66 David Flip Rodriguez	Second	Failed Slider Drop
No. 29 Naoya Tajima	Second	Failed Slider Drop
72 competitors	First	Failed

^{†} Kanno withdrew before Double Salmon Ladder because of a shoulder injury.

== 28th Competition ==
Aired: December 27, 2012

Competitor	Stage	Obstacle
No. 88 Yuuji Urushihara	Third	Failed Crazy Cliff Hanger
No. 89 Hitoshi Kanno	Third	Failed Crazy Cliff Hanger
No. 58 Kazuma Asa	Third	Failed Crazy Cliff Hanger
No. 87 Ryo Matachi	Second	Failed Passing Wall
No. 44 Koki Someya	Second	Failed Swap Salmon Ladder
95 competitors	First	Failed

== 29th Competition ==
Aired: June 27, 2013

Competitor	Stage	Obstacle
No. 79 Yusuke Morimoto	Third	Failed Pipe Slider
No. 97 Hitoshi Kanno	Third	Failed Crazy Cliff Hanger
No. 96 Kazuma Asa	Third	Failed Crazy Cliff Hanger
No. 87 Kenji Takahashi	Third	Failed Crazy Cliff Hanger
No. 93 Shunsuke Nagasaki	Second	Failed Passing Wall
No. 56 Li En-Chi	Second	Failed Passing Wall
No. 73 Masashi Hioki	Second	Failed Backstream
No. 67 Terukazu Ishikawa	Second	Failed Backstream
No. 57 Daisuke Morikami	Second	Failed Backstream
No. 99 Yuuji Urushihara	Second	Failed Backstream
No. 98 Ryo Matachi	Second	Failed Backstream
No. 91 Keitaro Yamamoto	Second	Failed Backstream
No. 90 Yuuya Kadono	Second	Failed Backstream
No. 89 Yoshiyuki Okuyama	Second	Failed Backstream
No. 41 Kouji Hashimoto	Second	Failed Backstream
No. 36 Shingo Yamamoto	Second	Failed Backstream
No. 60 Taiga Hoshikawa	Second	Failed Backstream
No. 65 Toshiharu Takami	Second	Disqualified on Swap Salmon Ladder ^{†}
No. 86 Wakky	Second	Failed Swap Salmon Ladder
No. 62 Hiromasa Katakabe	Second	Failed Swap Salmon Ladder
No. 61 Hidekazu Inoue	Second	Failed Cross Slider
79 competitors	First	Failed

^{†} Takami was disqualified for not landing properly on the fourth set of rungs.

Note: The third stage of this competition is a time attack, and only the person who clears it the fastest can challenge the Final.

== 30th Competition ==
Aired: July 3, 2014

Competitor	Stage	Obstacle
No. 2994 Ryo Matachi	Final	Failed Final Rope 23 meters up
No. 2967 Tomohiro Kawaguchi	Final	Failed Final Rope 15 meters up
No. 2973 Shinya Kishimoto	Third	Failed Vertical Limit
No. 2998 Kazuma Asa	Third	Failed Crazy Cliff Hanger
No. 2996 Hitoshi Kanno	Third	Failed Crazy Cliff Hanger
No. 2991 Drew Drechsel	Third	Failed Crazy Cliff Hanger
No. 2990 Li En-Chi	Third	Failed Crazy Cliff Hanger
No. 2986 Shunsuke Nagasaki	Third	Failed Crazy Cliff Hanger
No. 2974 Terukazu Ishikawa	Third	Failed Crazy Cliff Hanger
No. 2935 Masashi Hioki	Third	Failed Crazy Cliff Hanger
No. 3000 Yusuke Morimoto	Second	Failed Wall Lifting
No. 2969 Taiga Hoshikawa	Second	Failed Wall Lifting
No. 2993 Yuuji Urushihara	Second	Failed Wall Lifting
No. 2985 Yamaguchi Kosuke	Second	Failed Wall Lifting
No. 2972 Daisuke Morikami	Second	Failed Wall Lifting
No. 2970 Hiromasa Katakabe	Second	Failed Backstream
No. 2968 Yuuya Kadono	Second	Failed Backstream
No. 2992 Shingo Yamamoto	Second	Failed Backstream
No. 2999 Makoto Nagano	Second	Disqualified on Swap Salmon Ladder^{†}
No. 2995 Kenji Takahashi	Second	Disqualified on Swap Salmon Ladder^{†}
No. 2980 Toshihiro Takeda	Second	Disqualified on Swap Salmon Ladder^{†}
No. 2932 Hiroshige Yamamoto	Second	Disqualified on Swap Salmon Ladder^{†}
No. 2984 Koki Someya	Second	Failed Swap Salmon Ladder
No. 2982 Wakky	Second	Failed Swap Salmon Ladder
No. 2971 Toshiharu Takami	Second	Failed Swap Salmon Ladder
No. 2981 Kinnikun Nakayama	Second	Failed Cross Slider
No. 2965 Kung Cheen-Howng	Second	Failed Cross Slider
No. 2914 Noritomo Morisawa	Second	Withdrew (injured)^{††}
73 competitors	First	Failed

^{†} Yamamoto was disqualified for failing to land correctly on the 4th step, Nagano on the 3rd step, and Takahashi and Takeda on the 2nd step.

^{††} Morisawa cleared the First Stage but withdrew before the Second Stage due to tweaking his neck.

== 31st Competition ==
Aired: July 1, 2015

Competitor	Stage	Obstacle
No. 91 Yusuke Morimoto	Final	Total Victory (2.59 seconds left)
No. 96 Hitoshi Kanno	Third	Failed Vertical Limit Kai
No. 97 Tomohiro Kawaguchi	Third	Failed Crazy Cliff Hanger
No. 95 Kazuma Asa	Third	Failed Crazy Cliff Hanger
No. 94 Drew Drechsel	Third	Failed Crazy Cliff Hanger
No. 89 Kenji Takahashi	Third	Failed Crazy Cliff Hanger
No. 72 Ragivaru Anastase	Third	Failed Crazy Cliff Hanger
No. 31 Masashi Hioki	Third	Failed Crazy Cliff Hanger
No. 49 Zhang Wang Yang	Second	Failed Wall Lifting
No. 76 Yuuichi Okada	Second	Failed Wall Lifting
No. 34 Hiroshige Yamamoto	Second	Failed Backstream
No. 84 Alexander Mars	Second	Failed Salmon Ladder Kudari
No. 79 Kai Fukanuma	Second	Failed Salmon Ladder Nobori^{†}
No. 40 Riku Hanamoto	Second	Failed Salmon Ladder Nobori
No. 86 Masamitsu Kikuchi	Second	Failed Cross Slider
No. 82 Kenji Darvish	Second	Failed Cross Slider
No. 75 Kung Cheen-Howng	Second	Failed Cross Slider
83 competitors	First	Failed

^{†} Failed the transition onto the Salmon Ladder Kudari

== 32nd Competition ==
Aired: July 3, 2016

Competitor	Stage	Obstacle
No. 93 Drew Drechsel	Third	Failed Vertical Limit Kai†
No. 76 Jun Sato	Third	Failed Ultra Crazy Cliffhanger
No. 62 Brent Steffensen	Third	Failed Ultra Crazy Cliffhanger
No. 85 André Sihm	Third	Failed Sidewinder R Kai
No. 97 Tomohiro Kawaguchi	Third	Failed Flying Bar
No. 94 Ragivaru Anastase	Third	Failed Flying Bar
No. 87 Shunsuke Nagasaki	Third	Failed Flying Bar
No. 66 Yusuke Suzuki	Third	Failed Flying Bar
92 competitors	First	Failed

† The Ultra Crazy Cliffhanger was tied with the Vertical Limit Kai which Drew fell almost immediately after making the transition. First time since SASUKE 9 a Cliffhanger variant is beaten on its introductory tournament.

Note: All 8 competitors who cleared the First Stage also cleared the Second Stage.

== 33rd Competition ==
Aired: March 26, 2017

Competitor	Stage	Obstacle
No. 96 Drew Drechsel	Third	Failed Ultra Crazy Cliffhanger
No. 98 Shunsuke Nagasaki	Third	Failed Flying Bar
No. 95 Kazuma Asa	Third	Failed Flying Bar
No. 100 Yusuke Morimoto	Third	Failed Flying Bar
No. 97 Jun Sato	Third	Failed Flying Bar
No. 83 Wataru Mori	Second	Failed Reverse Conveyor
No. 45 Masashi Hioki	Second	Failed Reverse Conveyor
No. 90 Toshihiro Takeda	Second	Failed Salmon Ladder Kudari
No. 77 Dai Igarashi	Second	Failed Salmon Ladder Kudari
No. 86 Ryoichi Tsukada	Second	Failed Salmon Ladder Nobori
No. 85 Masayuki Kikchi	Second	Failed Salmon Ladder Nobori
No. 81 Takeru	Second	Failed Salmon Ladder Nobori
No. 52 Seiki Takasu	Second	Failed Salmon Ladder Nobori
87 competitors	First	Failed

== 34th Competition ==
Aired: October 8, 2017

Competitor	Stage	Obstacle
No. 100 Yusuke Morimoto	Third	Failed Vertical Limit Kai
No. 98 Tomohiro Kawaguchi	Third	Failed Ultra Crazy Cliffhanger
No. 97 Drew Drechsel	Third	Failed Ultra Crazy Cliffhanger
No. 96 Jun Sato	Third	Failed Ultra Crazy Cliffhanger
No. 87 Jessie Graff	Third	Failed Ultra Crazy Cliffhanger
No. 45 Masashi Hioki	Third	Failed Ultra Crazy Cliffhanger
No. 93 Ragivaru Anastase	Third	Failed Ultra Crazy Cliffhanger
No. 49 Satoshi Obata	Third	Failed Sidewinder Kai
No. 84 Yusuke Suzuki	Third	Failed Sidewinder Kai
No. 47 Hiroshige Yamamoto	Second	Failed Wall Lifting
No. 99 Yuuji Urushihara	Second	Failed Reverse Conveyor
No. 89 Kenji Darvish	Second	Failed Reverse Conveyor
No. 83 Kenji Takahashi	Second	Failed Reverse Conveyor
No. 74 Keitaro Yamamoto	Second	Failed Reverse Conveyor
No. 38 Shogo Ugajin	Second	Failed Backstream
No. 81 Takeru	Second	Failed Backstream
No. 95 Shunsuke Nagasaki	Second	Failed Spider Walk
No. 88 Ryoichi Tsukada	Second	Failed Salmon Ladder Kudari
No. 80 Dai Igarashi	Second	Failed Salmon Ladder Kudari
No. 91 Toshihiro Takeda	Second	Failed Salmon Ladder Kudari
No. 46 Seiki Takasu	Second	Failed Salmon Ladder Kudari
No. 86 Takaharu Nakagawa	Second	Failed Salmon Ladder Nobori
No. 34 Minami Ono	Second	Failed Salmon Ladder Nobori
No. 40 Tatsuhiro Fujimatsu	Second	Failed Salmon Ladder Nobori
76 competitors	First	Failed

== 35th Competition ==
Aired: March 26, 2018

Competitor	Stage	Obstacle
No. 100 Yusuke Morimoto	Final	Failed Final Rope 20 meters up
No. 99 Tomohiro Kawaguchi	Third	Failed Vertical Limit
No. 98 Drew Drechsel	Third	Failed Vertical Limit
No. 97 Jun Sato	Third	Failed Ultra Crazy Cliffhanger
No. 60 Masashi Hioki	Third	Failed Planet Bridge
No. 96 Kenji Darvish	Second	Failed Wall Lifting
No. 89 Keitaro Yamamoto	Second	Failed Spider Drop
No. 92 Shunsuke Nagasaki	Second	Failed Spider Drop
92 competitors	First	Failed

== 36th Competition ==
Aired: December 31, 2018

Competitor	Stage	Obstacle
No. 100 Yusuke Morimoto	Final	Failed Final Rope (0.5 seconds late/24.5 meters up)
No. 92 Ryo Matachi	Third	Failed Vertical Limit
No. 95 Yuuji Urushihara	Third	Failed Vertical Limit
No. 73 Tatsuya Tada	Third	Failed Vertical Limit
No. 96 Jun Sato	Third	Failed Ultra Crazy Cliffhanger
No. 71 Masashi Hioki	Third	Failed Ultra Crazy Cliffhanger
No. 63 Naoyuki Araki	Third	Failed Ultra Crazy Cliffhanger
No. 99 Tomohiro Kawaguchi	Third	Failed Ultra Crazy Cliffhanger
No. 98 Kenji Darvish	Third	Failed Sidewinder
No. 89 Benjamin Toyer	Third	Failed Flying Bar
No. 93 Keitaro Yamamoto	Second	Failed Wall Lifting
No. 76 Wataru Mori	Second	Disqualified on Reverse Conveyor ^{†}
No. 75 Shogo Ugajin	Second	Failed Reverse Conveyor
No. 97 Drew Drechsel	Second	Failed Reverse Conveyor ^{††}
No. 83 Takaharu Nakagawa	Second	Failed Spider Walk
85 competitors	First	Failed

^{†} Wataru used his legs on the side of the Reverse Conveyor.
^{††} Drew slipped off course when sliding down the chute from the Backstream

== 37th Competition ==
Aired: December 31, 2019

Competitor	Stage	Obstacle
No. 88 René Casselly	Final	Failed Salmon Ladder Jūgo Dan ^{†}
No. 49 Tatsuya Tada	Final	Failed Salmon Ladder Jūgo Dan
No. 96 Yuuji Urushihara	Third	Failed Pipe Slider^{††}
No. 94 Jun Sato	Third	Failed Cliffhanger Dimension
No. 47 Yoshiyuki Yamamoto	Third	Failed Cliffhanger Dimension
No. 60 Masashi Hioki	Third	Failed Cliffhanger Dimension
No. 98 Jessie Graff	Third	Failed Cliffhanger Dimension
No. 48 Yoshinori Isa	Third	Failed Cliffhanger Dimension
No. 75 Yusuke Suzuki	Second	Failed Spider Walk
No. 55 Koji Saikawa	Second	Failed Salmon Ladder Kudari
90 competitors	First	Failed

^{†}René was disqualified because both bars derailed.
^{††}The bar derailed as soon as Urushihara hung on the bar.

== 38th Competition ==
Aired: December 29, 2020

Competitor	Stage	Obstacle
No. 100 Yusuke Morimoto	Final	Total Victory (2.52 seconds left)
No. 49 Yoshiyuki Yamamoto	Third	Failed Cliff Hanger Dimension
No. 95 Tatsuya Tada	Third	Failed Cliff Hanger Dimension
No. 94 Jun Sato	Third	Failed Cliff Hanger Dimension
No. 50 Yoshinori Isa	Third	Failed Flying Bar
No. 99 Yuuji Urushihara	Second	Failed Wall Lifting
No. 40 Hayate Kajihara	Second	Failed Wall Lifting
No. 57 Masashi Hioki	Second	Failed Wall Lifting
No. 82 Naoyuki Araki	Second	Failed Reverse Conveyor
No. 14 Kōji Saikawa	Second	Failed Spider Drop
No. 88 Hikaru Iwamoto	Second	Failed Salmon Ladder Descent
No. 71 Ryo Matachi	Second	Failed Salmon Ladder Ascent
No. 74 Rinne Sugeta	Second	Failed Salmon Ladder Ascent
No. 90 Keitaro Yamamoto	Second	Failed Rolling Log
86 competitors	First	Failed

== 39th Competition ==
Aired: December 28, 2021

Competitor	Stage	Obstacle
No. 91 Tatsuya Tada	Third	Failed Vertical Limit
No. 59 Masashi Hioki	Third	Failed Cliff Hanger Dimension
No. 35 Hayate Kajihara	Third	Failed Cliff Hanger Dimension
No. 55 Yoshinori Isa	Third	Failed Swing Edge ^{†}
No. 50 Yoshiyuki Yamamoto	Third	Failed Swing Edge
No. 89 Ryo Matachi	Third	Failed Swing Edge
No. 90 Keitaro Yamamoto	Third	Failed Sidewinder
No. 77 Yusuke Suzuki	Third	Failed Sidewinder
No. 71 Tomohiro Mutou	Third	Failed Sidewinder
No. 9 Koji Saikawa	Second	Failed Wall Lifting
No. 20 Rinne Sugeta	Second	Failed Reverse Conveyor
No. 88 Hikaru Iwamoto	Second	Failed Reverse Conveyor
No. 14 Yusuke Goto	Second	Failed Salmon Ladder Descent
No. 31 Hideki Ajima	Second	Failed Rolling Log
86 competitors	First	Failed

^{†} When making the first transition, Yoshinori grabbed the frame of the obstacle and went out of bounds.

== 40th Competition ==
Airdate: December 27, 2022

Competitor	Stage	Obstacle
No. 4000 Yūsuke Morimoto	Final	Failed Final Rope (1 seconds late/24.5 meters up)
No. 3950 Yoshiyuki Yamamoto	Final	Failed Final Rope 17 meters up
No. 3973 Tatsuya Tada	Final	Failed Salmon Ladder Jugo Dan
No. 3975 Keitaro Yamamoto	Third	Failed Pipe Slider
No. 3999 Yuuji Urushihara	Third	Failed Vertical Limit
No. 3974 Naoyuki Araki	Third	Failed Cliff Dimension
No. 3965 Hayate Kajihara	Third	Failed Cliff Dimension
No. 3972 Jun Satō	Third	Failed Cliff Dimension
No. 3993 Tomohiro Kawaguchi	Third	Failed Swing Edge
No. 3924 Yoshinori Isa	Third	Failed Swing Edge
No. 3977 Yusuke Suzuki	Third	Failed Sidewinder
No. 3976 Tomohiro Mutou	Third	Failed Sidewinder
No. 3990 Oliver Edelmann	Second	Failed Wall Lifting
No. 3984 Stefanie Edelmann	Second	Failed Wall Lifting
No. 3985 Jessie Graff	Second	Failed Reverse Conveyor
No. 3910 Kōji Saikawa	Second	Failed Reverse Conveyor
No. 3995 Shingo Yamamoto	Second	Failed Reverse Conveyor
No. 3971 Ryoichi Tsukada	Second	Failed Backstream
No. 3955 Masashi Hioki	Second	Failed Backstream
No. 3991 Kane Kosugi	Second	Failed Backstream
No. 3982 Ayano Oshima	Second	Failed Spider Drop
No. 3943 Shunsuke Nagasaki	Second	Failed Spider Drop
No. 3949 Hayato Takasuka	Second	Failed Spider Run
No. 3987 Yoshikazu Fujita	Second	Failed Rolling Log
76 competitors	First	Failed

== 41st Competition ==
Airdate: December 27, 2023

Competitor	Stage	Obstacle
No. 100 Yusuke Morimoto	Third	Failed Vertical Limit Burst
No. 80 Keitaro Yamamoto	Third	Failed Vertical Limit Burst
No. 59 Ryosuke Miyaoka	Third	Failed Vertical Limit Burst
No. 98 Tatsuya Tada	Third	Failed Vertical Limit Burst
No. 99 Yoshiyuki Yamamoto	Third	Failed Cliff Dimension
No. 97 Yuuji Urushihara	Third	Failed Cliff Dimension
No. 93 René Casselly	Third	Failed Cliff Dimension
No. 92 Daniel Gil	Third	Failed Cliff Dimension
No. 76 Jun Sato	Third	Failed Cliff Dimension
No. 44 Hayate Kajihara	Third	Failed Cliff Dimension
No. 16 Yuta Yamashita	Third	Failed Cliff Dimension
No. 77 Tomohiro Mutou	Third	Failed Cliff Dimension
No. 51 Masashi Hioki	Third	Failed Cliff Dimension
No. 45 Wasabi	Third	Failed Cliff Dimension
No. 79 Naoyuki Araki	Third	Failed Sidewinder
No. 52 Shuzo Uchimiya	Second	Failed Wall Lifting
No. 42 Yuta Nakashima	Second	Failed Backstream
No. 90 Ryo Matachi	Second	Failed Salmon Ladder Nobori
No. 60 Yusuke Goto	Second	Failed Rolling Log
No. 41 Kaio Nagano	Second	Failed Rolling Log
No. 61 Shunsuke Nagasaki	Second	Withdrew/^{†}Injury
79 competitors	First	Failed

^{†} Nagasaki cleared the First Stage but withdrew before the Second Stage due to a leg injury.

== 42nd Competition ==
Aired: December 25, 2024

Competitor	Stage	Obstacle
No. 78 Ryosuke Miyaoka	Final	Failed Final Rope 16 meters up
No. 100 Yusuke Morimoto	Third	Failed Vertical Limit Burst
No. 90 Iliann Cherif	Third	Failed Vertical Limit Burst
No. 77 Tatsuya Tada	Third	Failed Vertical Limit Burst
No. 99 Yuuji Urushihara	Third	Failed Cliff Dimension
No. 91 Daniel Gil	Third	Failed Cliff Dimension
No. 76 Naoyuki Araki	Third	Failed Cliff Dimension
No. 60 Muto Tomohiro	Third	Failed Cliff Dimension
No. 46 Yuta Nakashima	Third	Failed Cliff Dimension
No. 97 Yoshiyuki Yamamoto	Third	Failed Swing Edge
No. 96 Tomohiro Kawaguchi	Third	Failed Swing Edge
No. 79 Keitaro Yamamoto	Third	Failed Swing Edge
No. 61 Masashi Hioki	Third	Failed Swing Edge
No. 47 Hayato Takasuka	Third	Failed Swing Edge
No. 40 Hayate Kajihara	Third	Failed Swing Edge
No. 69 Shuzo Uchimiya	Third	Failed Sidewinder
No. 54 Yusuke Suzuki	Second	Failed Wall Lifting
No. 71 Hitoshi Kanno	Second	Failed Reverse Conveyor
No. 33 Yasuhito Imoto	Second	Disqualified on Reverse Conveyor^{†}
No. 52 Rinne Sugeta	Second	Failed Backstream
No. 18 Koji Saikawa	Second	Failed Spider Run
No. 15 Hiroki Kajita	Second	Failed Salmon Ladder Nobori
No. 85 Olivia Vivian	Second	Failed Rolling Log ^{††}
No. 75 Jun Sato	Second	Failed Rolling Log
No. 72 Shunsuke Nagasaki	Second	Failed Rolling Log
No. 70 Ryo Matachi	Second	Failed Rolling Log
No. 45 Kaiou Nagano	Second	Failed Rolling Log
No. 31 Takumi Uemura	Second	Failed Rolling Log
72 competitors	First	Failed

^{†} Yasuhito used his hands and legs on the side of the Reverse Conveyor.
^{††} Her hair touched the water before falling into the water.

== 43rd Competition ==
Aired: December 24 & 25, 2025

Competitor	Stage	Obstacle
No. 100 Yusuke Morimoto	Final	Failed Final Rope 25 meters up
No. 97 Yoshiyuki Yamamoto	Third	Failed Cliff Dimension
No. 22 Daniel Gil	Third	Failed Cliff Dimension
No. 19 Ashlin Herbert	Third	Failed Cliff Dimension
No. 11 Josh Levin	Third	Failed Cliff Dimension
No. 89 Ryosuke Miyaoka	Third	Failed Swing Edge Kai
No. 48 Yuta Nakashima	Third	Failed Swing Edge Kai
No. 47 Kaiou Nagano	Third	Failed Swing Edge Kai
No. 5 Tim Champion	Third	Failed Swing Edge Kai
No. 96 Tomohiro Kawaguchi	Third	Failed Flying Bar
No. 14 Benjamin Grams	Second	Failed Salmon Ladder Kudari
No. 80 Keitaro Yamamoto	Second	Failed Rolling Log
110 competitors	First	Failed (1 Withdrew^{†})

^{†} One competitor, Hikaru Iwamoto was competed This Sasuke Competition under No. 88, but Withdrew to compete first stage.
