= Sasuke (TV series) =

Japanese sports entertainment game show

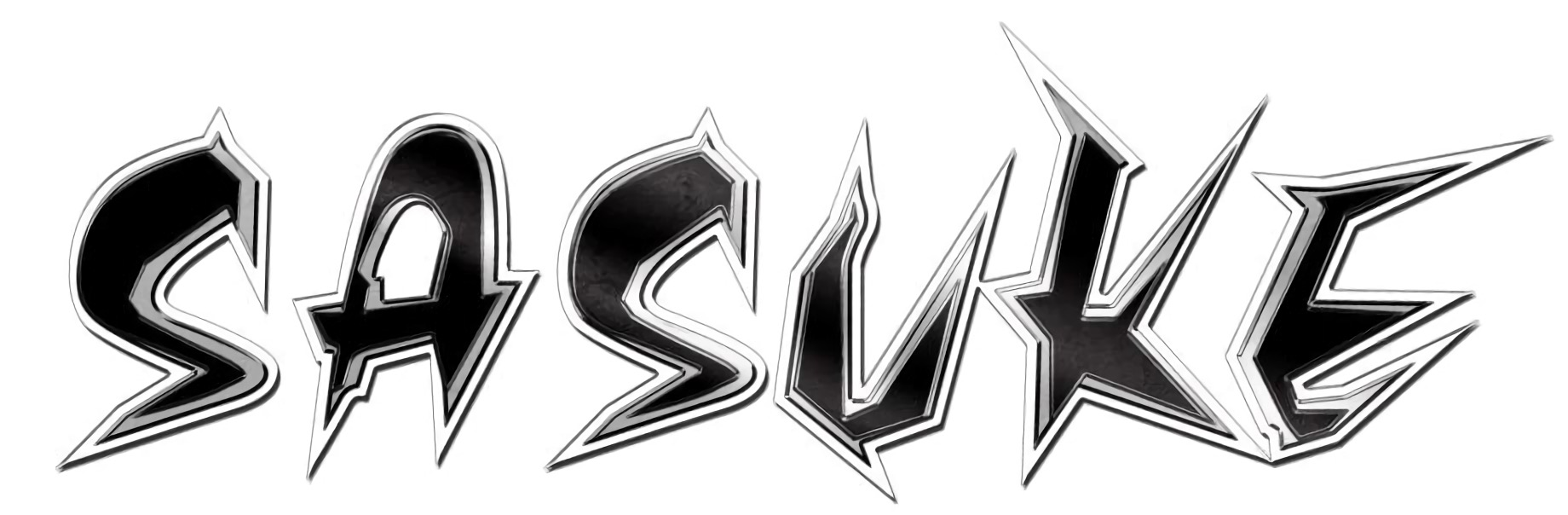
- Also known as: Ninja Warrior; Sasuke Rising; Sasuke Ninja Warrior
- Japanese: SASUKE(サスケ)
- Genre: Sports entertainment Obstacle course
- Created by: Masato Inui
- Directed by: Ushio Higuchi (1997–2011); Masato Inui (1997–2005, 2012–present)
- Voices of: Ichiro Furutachi (1997–2003); Takahiro Tosaki (1997); Keisuke Hatsuta (1998–2008, 2010–14); Wataru Ogasawara (2005–2011, 2019); Fumiyasu Sato (2009–2011, 2018); Tomohiro Ishii (2012–14); Ryusuke Ito (2010, 2015); Shinya Sugiyama (2016–present); Kengo Komada (2004, 2015–18); Shinichiro Azumi (2018–2019); Tomohiro Kiire (2020); Kazato Kumazaki (2020–2024); Masatoshi Nanba (2021–present); Koki Ozawa (2024–present)
- Narrated by: Takashi Matsuo (1997); Tsutomu Tareki (1998–2005); Ken Taira (2005); Kiyoshi Kobayashi (2006–2011); Yuya Takagawa (2012–present); Masato Obara (2014); Jun Hattori (2018–present)
- Country of origin: Japan
- Original language: Japanese
- No. of episodes: 43 competitions (list of episodes)

Production
- Executive producer: Ushio Higuchi
- Producers: Yoshiyuki Kogake; Makoto Fujii
- Production locations: Mt. Midoriyama, Aoba-ku, Yokohama
- Running time: 120 to 360-minute specials
- Production companies: TBS Sports (1997-2003); Dreamax Television (2003-2005, 2012–2015); Monster9 (2005–2011); FOLCOM (2012–)

Original release
- Network: JNN (TBS)
- Release: 27 September 1997 – present

Related
- Kinniku Banzuke; Kunoichi; Pro Sportsman No. 1 Viking: The Ultimate Obstacle Course

Sasuke (Japanese: サスケ, romanized: SASUKE; /ˈsɑː.skeɪ/ SAH-skay; Japanese pronunciation: [sasɯ̥ke]) is a Japanese sports entertainment reality television show that has been airing since 1997 in which 100 competitors attempt to complete a four-stage obstacle course. Failing any obstacle during a stage, or running out of time on stages with set time limits, leads to elimination. Finishing a stage by reaching the end and hitting the buzzer will grant advancement to the next stage. Sasuke also has many international versions of itself, mainly called "Ninja Warrior", with 20 local shows.

Recorded at Midoriyama studios in Yokohama, it airs on Tokyo Broadcasting System (TBS), typically between Japanese television drama seasons. The show's namesake is Sarutobi Sasuke, a ninja character in Japanese traditional storytelling. Each episode airs an entire tournament as a single special, ranging from 70 minutes to 6 hours. There have been 43 specials produced, with approximately one or two per year. The show is produced by TBS and began as a segment within the series Kinniku Banzuke (筋肉番付; 'Muscle Ranking'), another sports entertainment competition, which aired on G4 in the United States under the name Unbeatable Banzuke. Competitions generally start in the daytime and continue until completed regardless of weather or darkness. After Monster9's bankruptcy in November 2011, Tokyo Broadcasting System handed production over to the studio FOLCOM, who relaunched the show under the title Sasuke Rising. For the 35th tournament TBS renamed the show once again, to Sasuke Ninja Warrior, aligning with the worldwide Ninja Warrior brand. The show's logo would be changed for the 36th edition, with the new logo's year being updated for subsequent editions.

== History ==
=== 1991–1995: origins and The King of Sports ===
In 1991, TBS Sports employee Ushio Higuchi began developing ideas for a new sports competition. Having worked up the ladder at TBS enough to produce live sports coverage, Higuchi believed he had the pull to begin creating original series. Following his experiences producing live events such as the 1988 Summer Olympics and 1990 FIFA World Cup, Higuchi had admired seeing athletes perform record setting feats in individual sports, and decided to move forward with creating a sporting discipline that aimed to crown the best all-around athlete. His original concept was to create a variant of the multi-disciplinary sports such as the Modern pentathlon and Decathlon that would test speed, agility, strength and balance. Higuchi submitted a concept pitch to TBS for a series called The King of Sports, but TBS denied the proposal stating that Higuchi would need to form agreements with athletics associations to recruit athletes. Higuchi had attempted to reach out to as many organizations as he could, including the Japanese Olympic Committee and International Olympic Committee, however all denied partnership due to the lack of portfolio on Higuchi's part, a perceived risk of injury to athletes, and a lack of benefit for the organizations themselves.

In July 1992, Ushio Higuchi was producing coverage for the 1992 Summer Olympics, in charge of key elements such as camera angles and narration. During this time, he became closely acquainted with legendary sports commentator Ichiro Furutachi. Higuchi discussed his idea with Furutachi, who agreed to collaborate and provide services as lead narrator for The King of Sports. The coverage of the 1992 Olympics was a resounding success, and so with an increased portfolio and assistance from Furutachi, Higuchi resubmitted his proposal. TBS showed an increased interest in the format, but were still hesitant until athletes could be recruited. TBS suggested using less popular athletes, however Higuchi denied this request stating it would dilute his aspirations for the series.

Throughout 1993, Higuchi worked on recruiting athletes for The King of Sports, and was able to secure contracts with individual teams, creating a roster of 28 athletes from Baseball, Wrestling, Boxing, Golf and Motorsports. With the backing of athletes, The King of Sports was approved, and debuted on December 29, 1993 under the new title Pro Sportsman No. 1. The tournament was filmed in leftover venues from the 1964 Summer Olympics and featured a low budget. The initial tournament featured a pentathlon of five skills: Sprinting, Push-ups, Vaulting, Tug of war and Obstacle Racing. The initial obstacle course, titled "Survival Race", featured hurdles, a balance beam, climbing and rope climbing, all to be completed under a time limit.

Reception to the pilot of Sportsman No. 1 was mediocre, but TBS made enough revenue and saw the potential in the series. A second tournament was greenlit with a higher budget, to air as a special on New Year's Day 1995. In Japan, New Year's is spent with family, and TBS felt that a sporting event was a safe and accessible option to capitalize on this market. Pro Sportsman's 1995 tournament filmed in a larger venue with a consistent aesthetic, styling everything in Greco-Roman decor to imitate the classical Olympics. New disciplines such as beach flags and sled pulling were added to increase the number of events to seven. In addition, Higuchi secured more revered athletes to appear in side events called "Dream Showdowns," special exhibition events intended to attract more viewers that would be aired alongside the main event. This second tournament of Sportsman No. 1 was a resounding hit, dominating TV ratings for New Year's Day.

With a successful series in his portfolio, Higuchi pitched the subtitle "Clash of Olympians" for the third tournament. To his surprise, the promotional manager for the Japanese Olympic Committee had watched the New Year's Day special of Sportsman No. 1 and loved it, and helped Higuchi secure an official partnership. The JOC and Higuchi produced two crossover specials, with the first fast-tracked to air March 1995, starring athletes from the Summer Olympics with new disciplines of sit-ups and pull-ups. The second collaboration in October 1995 featured athletes from the Winter Olympics and featured imaginary chair as a new event.

=== 1995–1997: concept revision and Kinniku Banzuke ===
Through 1995, TBS received a high volume of inquiries from amateur athletes and members of the public expressing interest in competing on future installments of Sportsman No. 1. TBS and Higuchi made the decision to keep only professional athletes in Sportsman No. 1, instead launching a sister program named Kinniku Banzuke which would allow members of the public to compete via public auditions.

A pilot season of Kinniku Banzuke began airing at 1:15am JST on July 8, 1995 as a series of eleven 30 minute pilot episodes. TBS believed that it would be an ideal late night program, as it would be a niche program targeting adult men already interested in athletics. These episodes saw sit-ups, push-ups, and vaulting return from Sportsman. Qualification rounds toured to Tohoku, Kansai, Okinawa, Hokuriku, Hokkaido and Kyushu, where the top athletes would then be invited to a final competition in Yokohama at the end of the season.

The series became an unprecedented hit, with record high viewership despite the late broadcast time. This was attributed to several factors; family and friends of competitors tuned in to cheer them on, women tuned in due to the Odagiri effect, and large numbers of youth found the show fun and aspired to compete. TBS immediately pivoted their approach and moved the series to a prime time window on Sundays beginning in October 1995. In addition, they greatly expanded the number of events returning from Sportsman, and created additional competition divisions for women and youth. They also invested in new events, most notably a backflip racing event named Bakuten that attracted success from professional gymnasts such as Yukio Iketani.

In the Spring of 1996, Higuchi decided to branch the series out to include two new categories of events. The first were variations of target practice under different sports disciplines such as Baseball and Soccer, which allowed an influx of professional athletes to compete due to the lowered risk. The second category were skill-based obstacles courses that featured 9 obstacles. Higuchi's initial concept for this was a course inspired by Bakuten that featured athletes navigating different areas such as stairs, parallel bars and ramps while in a handstand. Originally developed under the name "Handstand Jungle", the event debuted in May 1996 as Hand Walk. Hand Walk was extremely popular, and so Higuchi expanded this obstacle course idea into several other disciplines; Super Rider for bike trials, Like a Pierrot for Unicycle, Kangaroo for pogo stick and Bamboo Derby for stilt walking. As expected, these events were similarly popular, and so Higuchi began to expand into original course ideas, such as Sponge Bridge, a precision balance course, and Spider Walk, an event based on the Ninja skill of moving while perched between two walls, as was historically done to move stealthily between two buildings in an alley.

The original courses Higuchi had designed such as Hand Walk were beginning to be defeated after several filming sessions, and so he decided to employ recursive self-improvement in courses, where events would return with an increasing number in their title, featuring renewed and more difficult obstacles to keep competitors indefinitely returning to events. Due to the continued success of Kinniku Banzuke and increased funding from revenue, TBS requested that Higuchi prepare a special broadcast for March 1997 that would have an extended runtime of several hours and feature bigger special guests and larger events. Higuchi designed a grander sequel to Hand Walk called Hand Walk Tower, which featured three stages of increasing difficulty. Competitors would have to complete each stage in order, and if anyone were to complete them all, they would be awarded the title of Kanzenseiha, or Total Victory. This special was extremely successful, in part due to the outstanding performance of Naoki Akiya, who achieved Total Victory on Hand Walk Tower.

=== 1997: Sasuke ===
Almost immediately after the broadcast of Hand Walk Tower, Ushio Higuchi approached Masato Inui, who had worked as assistant producer on Hand Walk Tower among other events, to immediately begin production on a new event for broadcast in a second special, to air September 1997. Higuchi's idea was to create a multi-staged course that used the all around athletic skills of competitors similar to Sportsman No. 1, while being directly inspired by the different skills performed by ninjas, such as Spider Walk. Like Hand Walk Tower, this new project was to be a larger multi-stage course following the same format. He gave this idea to Inui to expand and create the course, while also being directed to save cost by reusing elements from previous events wherever possible.

Inui fleshed out plans for a four stage course. The course would run linearly, so that they could be filmed in a way that would mimic popular video games such as Super Mario Bros. in a similar way to TBS's previous event Adventure Zone, which aired as a segment on Takeshi's Castle. Stylistically, Inui took inspiration from the film Castle in the Sky, which itself was based on historic events in Wales. The 1st Stage would feature urban navigation and balance skills ninjas would need to hop over barrels, climb walls, and run across rooftops, and took stylistic inspiration from running along a castle wall. The 2nd Stage was a speed based on the escape skills a ninja would require to evade capture, such as avoiding enemy weapons, crawling under raised temples, and passing heavy barricades. Thematically, the 2nd Stage was based on industrial factories. The 3rd Stage featured the precision skills a ninja would use, namely running across fenceposts, crossing hanging beams, and crossing bamboo trusses and flag poles. The Final Stage featured a tower climb similar to what a ninja would use to climb into the upper chambers of an enemy palace they were infiltrating.

Due to the cramped spaces used to film Hand Walk Tower, Inui had originally intended to film this new program on a large scale outdoor course. Unfortunately, due to the short turnaround time on production, the desired location at Midoriyama studios was not available, and so they had to rent Tokyo Bay NK Hall instead. (Note: Because Midoriyama still operated a motocross track until 2025.)

Higuchi suggested the format for the show use an idea he had called "Survival Attack", which was loosely inspired by the format of TBS's previous series Takeshi's Castle. 100 individuals, the equivalent of a military troupe, would try and conquer the course as soldiers. Attempts were ordered based on their reputation, metaphorically representing military ranks. Highly respected competitors such as Olympians and prestigious celebrities would run later, with women and commoners running earlier. Unlike Takeshi's Castle, only those who succeeded in each stage would be permitted to advance and attempt the next.

The event debuted under the title Kyūkyoku no sabaibaru atakku SASUKE (究極のサバイバルアタックSASUKE; Ultimate Survival Attack Sasuke) on September 27, 1997 to widespread acclaim.

=== 1998–2002: serialization ===
Despite Higuchi and Inui intending Sasuke to be a one time special event, TBS was flooded with thousands calls and letters asking how they could apply for the series. They made the decision to produce a second tournament of Sasuke under a higher budget and air it during the fifth Kinniku Banzuke special in September 1998. Sasuke's second tournament filmed outdoors at Midoriyama Studios as originally desired, and featured an entirely new aesthetic on the course. Due to the high number of clears in the first tournament, the time limit on the 1st Stage was reduced, and the 3rd Stage was fully revamped to feature the now iconic final dismount from a bar. Competitors who were successful in the first tournament or became popular due to their charismatic appearance would receive higher numbers. Sasuke's second tournament received a staggering 20% increase in viewership from the already high number of viewers it already had, and was able to outcompete traditional sports like baseball, leading to TBS approving an ongoing serialization of tournaments airing every Spring and Fall.

Additionally, due to extremely high demand from youth, TBS launched the new series Sasuke Junior the (Kosasuke) alongside Sasuke's second tournament, which featured 100 children between the ages of 8 and 12 competing on a scaled down course. Unlike Sasuke, the first three stages were completed back-to-back, with the time continuing to run between then. The 3rd Stage was replaced with a precision trapeze swing, and the Final Stage featured a pole climb instead of a rope. Sasuke Junior aired as 6–10 minute segments at the beginning of Kinniku Banzuke episodes, leading each tournament to be broadcast over 5–8 episodes.

Sasuke's third tournament broadcast in Spring 1999 and featured the debut of the iconic Rolling Log, as well as changing the end of the 1st Stage to a shorter rope climb, which would eventually lead to the short climb at the end of the 1st Stage to become a common course element for the series.

Summer 1999 saw the release of Dream Team in Korea, a series that directly plagiarized the contents of Sportsman No. 1 and Sasuke produced by Korean Broadcasting System, a network who had previously engaged in a legal dispute with TBS over the plagiarism of Takeshi's Castle. While unofficial, this marked the first presence of the series outside Japan.

Fall 1999 saw the broadcast of the Sasuke's fourth tournament, which debuted the obstacle Cliffhanger, which has since become a staple in all Sasuke and Ninja Warrior series worldwide. This tournament also saw Kazuhiko Akiyama become the first ever person to defeat the entire Sasuke course, and iconic moment in the series' history.

In the Spring of 2000, Sasuke's fifth tournament was broadcast. This tournament embraced the recursive improvement idea from Kinniku Banzuke, and featured redesigned stages. The 1st Stage saw the debut of the Warped Wall, possibly the most iconic obstacle in the series' history. Additionally, the final stage was revamped to be taller, and featured a Spider Climb prior to the rope.

In March 2001, Sasuke reached all time peak viewership during its seventh tournament, with 26% of all households in Japan watching. The tournament saw Shingo Yamamoto dislocate his shoulder in the final stage.

In December 2001, Higuchi debuted a new special called Kunoichi. The concept was generally the same as Sasuke, but with the course rebalanced to the strengths of women, and themed based on the folklore of Kunoichi. Prior to this point, only a single women had ever cleared the 1st Stage on Sasuke, and so the goal was to have women see the same level of success. Despite this, Kunoichi's debut tournament saw only two individuals clear the 1st Stage, only to fail at the start of the 2nd Stage. But even with poor results, Kunoichi was a rating success, and TBS began producing new tournaments annually.

=== 2002–2005: independence and restructuring ===
During a filming session of Kinniku Banzuke in May 2002, a competitor suffered a paralyzing fall on a new strength-based spinoff course called Power Island. Filming was immediately suspended, and an investigation revealed two additional minor injuries. As a result, a formal safety audit was initiated by the Japanese government into potential unacceptable safety risks on the sets of Kinniku Banzuke. The outcome of the investigation indicated that the majority of course events in Kinniku Banzuke would need to be reworked to be compliant with safety regulations. TBS planned to address these concerns and relaunch Kinniku Banzuke under the new title Taiiku World in the future. Since pre-production on the tenth Sasuke tournament was already underway at the time of the accident, they made the decision to launch Sasuke as an independent program in order to maintain the original broadcast window of September 2002. Despite this change, viewership did not decline for Sasuke, and so they made the decision to continue producing Sasuke biannually. Kane Kosugi, who had previously hosted several aftershows and spinoffs of Kinniku Banzuke left the franchise to focus on his acting career and reduce the amount of training he had to do to switch between.

In July 2003, TBS went through restructuring of its internal studios. They made the decision to no longer have TBS Sports produce Sasuke or Taiiku World, and instead it would be handled by new acquisition Dreamax Teleivision, a studio that had previously only created historical dramas. Due to this, Ushio Higuchi and Masato Inui were all relocated to Dreamax to assist with production. As a result of the lack of live athletics experience among Dreamax, production was halted on Taiiku World and outtakes from past events were used to fill episodes until it would end in September. Kunoichi was spun off into its own standalone program similar to Sasuke beginning with the third tournament in September 2003. Ichiro Furutachi would leave the production at this time after 11 years working alongside Higuchi.

In October 2003, Dreamax launched Golden Muscle, an attempt to reboot Kinniku Banzuke in Furutachi's absence, to make room for Jay Kabira and Yuko Mizuno. Its debut season would heavily feature Sasuke content in the form of qualification rounds for Sasuke's 13th tournament. Golden Muscle would prove to be a failure, due to lower budget, the lack of experience in Dreamax, and struggling to attract the same athletes as past series.

In Summer of 2004, Masato Inui left Dreamax following production disputes and frustrations with the series, forming his own production studio FOLCOM alongside several other producers from Kinniku Banzuke. Production stalls led to Sasuke's 14th tournament being delayed until January 2005. Following this tournament, Ushio Higuchi would too decide to leave Dreamax and begin his own production company, Monster9.

=== 2005–2011: Monster9, American qualifiers and cancellation ===
Shortly after founding Monster9, Higuchi announced his newest Survival Attack spinoff, Viking, which was to film immediately and air on competing network FujiTV. Viking featured the same general format as Sasuke, but brought in aspects of other Kinniku Banzuke events such as Ottoto 9, Amazing Road, Body Clock and Brain Panic. Within days of announcing Viking, TBS filed for ownership of the Sasuke brand, and further press releases regarding Viking were modified to remove reference to Survival Attack or Sasuke by name. This led to confusion regarding the series, giving many of the same competitors who appeared on Viking, and at the time believed they were directly related.

Following the release of Viking, TBS and Higuchi were able to come to an agreement where Higuchi would continue to produce Sasuke, Kunoichi and Sportsman No. 1 as a contractor for TBS. Production on Sasuke resumed, with the 15th tournament broadcasting in July 2005, and resumed its Spring and Fall schedule in 2006. In Sasuke's 17th tournament, fisherman Makoto Nagano became only the second person to complete the Sasuke course, prompting a widespread re-imagining of Sasuke. At the same time, Higuchi had been fired from FujiTV for mismanagement of Viking at the end of 2006. As a result, Sasuke's 18th tournament boasted the most extensive renewal that ever occurred in a Ninja Warrior series, utilizing the fabricated course components from both Sasuke and Viking to replace or modify many of the obstacles on the entire course. This tournament introduced the Salmon Ladder, which would become a staple for Ninja Warrior series worldwide.

Overseas, NBCUniversal's niche gaming network G4 licensed Kinniku Banzuke, Sasuke and Kunoichi from TBS, where they created their own subtitled edits of the series under the titles Ninja Warrior, Unbeatable Banzuke and Women of Ninja Warrior. The show proved to be quite popular with the small network, and so G4 pursued a closer partnership with Higuchi and TBS. In Summer 2007, G4 launched American Ninja Challenge, a reality show where contestants could audition and take part in a series of challenges to win a spot in Sasuke's 19th tournament. Two competitors went to Japan, however Sasuke's 19th tournament proved to be the most challenging in the show's history (and still the worst outcome of any tournament worldwide), with only two 1st Stage clears, who both went on to fail at the Salmon Ladder. American Ninja Challenge returned for a second season in 2008, where Levi Meeuwenburg shocked Japanese audiences after being the only competitor to clear the 2nd Stage, earning him the title of Last Man Standing. The co-operation between American Ninja Challenge and Sasuke continued for two additional seasons, before rebranding to American Ninja Warrior, where hundreds of competitors competed to appear on Sasuke. The show saw continued interest, with the 2nd and 3rd seasons sending competitors to Sasuke's 26th and 27th tournaments. In Japan, breakout star Yuji Urushihara became the third to achieve Total Victory, and then the first to achieve Total Victory twice only three seasons later.

=== 2012–present: reboot, management change and spinoffs ===
Following the end of the Monster9 legal proceedings in July 2012, TBS made the decision to reboot Sasuke and Sportsman No. 1. Sasuke would be renamed Sasuke Rising and would be produced by FOLCOM, with former assistant producer and series creator Masato Inui returning to helm the show alongside Dreamax Television. Sportsman No. 1 would be handled by other TBS departments and would be renamed to Sports Danshi Grand Prix, due to a ownership dispute over the trademark with Ushio Higuchi.

In 2015, Yusuke Morimoto became the fourth person to achieve Total Victory. Following Sasuke's 31st tournament, FOLCOM took over full control of the production of Sasuke. 2017 additionally saw a full reboot of Kunoichi, featuring redesigned courses more akin to Sasuke.

In order to regain interest in the series, many adaptations began introducing changes to the format. American Ninja Warrior introduced twists such as the Safety Pass, Speed Pass, Power Tower and side by side racing – all changes that would be seen extensively abroad in the 2020s. Sasuke would remain the only series that remained true to the roots of the series.

Following the failure of KuroOvi, GoldEggs sought to create a chain of ninja gyms across Japan titled Ninja Park, which would additionally host in-person competitions under the banner Ninjathlon. As part of this process, GoldEggs would file trademark ownership claims over several iconic Sasuke obstacles in both Japan and the United States. While unsuccessful in the US, Higuchi and GoldEggs were able to successfully claim six obstacles in Japan. As a result, beginning in Sasuke's 40th tournament, several obstacles were renamed to avoid legal injunctions, most notably with the Spider Walk being renamed to Spider Run, and Cliffhanger Dimension being renamed to Cliff Dimension. The trademark registration for the Spider Walk was rejected on November 8, 2022.

In the 2020s, TBS would invest heavily into the Sasuke brand following the announcement that aspects of Sasuke would be brought into the Olympics beginning with the 2028 Summer Olympics. In 2024, TBS broadcast the first ever Sasuke World Cup shortly after the 2024 Summer Olympics, featuring a total of 35 top ninja competitors from Australia, France, Germany, Japan and the United States. In January 2025, TBS rebooted Kunoichi and Sasuke Junior. In March 2025, TBS debuted a new spinoff format called Hanzo that brought in elements of swimming, shooting, fencing and running to align the format more closely with the Modern Pentathlon. In March 2026, TBS debuted new crossover spinoff format called Musou that mixed the format of Sasuke, Kunoichi and other TBS physical gameshows such as Takeshi's Castle, Sports Danshi Grand Prix, DOORS and Tokyo Friend Park.

== Format ==
An initial group of competitors are recruited to compete, originally consisting of competitor who excelled on Kinniku Banzuke such as Katsumi Yamada, Tomohiro Tatsukawa and Akira Omori, and in later seasons by reinviting competitors who have done well on Sasuke, and occasionally its international adaptations.

The remaining spots are filled by applications who could submit videos, originally via VHS, and later via DVD and the internet. Shortlisted applicants are interviewed with a group selected based on a combination of physical skills, personality and passion. In some seasons, the remainder is then filled by having hopefuls compete in preliminary trial rounds. These can vary from Sasuke courses, to Boot camp style tasks, to a marathon, or a combination of the above.

=== Course structure ===
Sasuke consists of four stages of increasing difficulty; competitors must complete each stage to advance to the next. Each competition is taped one to nine weeks prior to broadcast, where it is edited down to show only a handful of runs that are deemed either interesting, or featured a notable competitor. In the 36th and 37th competitions, only the 1st through 3rd stages were recorded in advance, with the Final Stage broadcasting live from Yokohama Red Brick Warehouse.

The object is to hit the buzzer at the end of each course before the allotted time expires. If a competitor goes out of bounds, runs out of time or comes into contact with the water in any of the pits below the course, they are eliminated from the competition.

== Notable competitors ==
=== Sasuke All-Stars ===
The Sasuke All-Stars were a group of six favored competitors, established by the TBS network, originally thought to be the most likely to clear all four stages. Consisting of Shingo Yamamoto, Katsumi Yamada, Kazuhiko Akiyama, Toshihiro Takeda, Makoto Nagano and Bunpei Shiratori, they comprised a large portion of the competitors' success in the first decade of Sasuke. The first two champions, Akiyama and Nagano, are also included, as is the only competitor to compete in every tournament, Yamamoto.

The All-Stars were officially 'retired' in the 28th tournament, but this decision was reversed. Shingo Yamamoto continued to compete in Sasuke 29 and onwards. Takeda retired in Sasuke 38, Shiratori retired in Sasuke 30 but returned in the 42nd, 43rd tournament, Nagano retired in Sasuke 32, but has since made appearances in the 38th, 40th, 41st, 42 and 43nd tournaments. Akiyama retired in Sasuke 28, but returned in the 40th tournament, and Yamada has competed in all tournaments since Sasuke 33.

=== Sasuke New Stars ===
The Sasuke New Stars (Shin Sedai) are younger competitors who made a name for themselves during the Shin-Sasuke era. "Shin Sedai" or New Stars became famous since Sasuke 17, after Shunsuke Nagasaki made it to the Final Stage. There was a brief hiatus before the term was re-popularized in Sasuke 22 when Yuuji and Kanno made it to the Third Stage. Membership in the Shin Sedai has been more fluid than the All-Stars, with Shunsuke Nagasaki, Yuuji Urushihara, Hitoshi Kanno, Koji Hashimoto, Jun Sato, Ryo Matachi, Kazuma Asa, Yusuke Morimoto, Tomohiro Kawaguchi, Shinya Kishimoto, Masashi Hioki and Yusuke Suzuki all having been considered members at certain points.

=== Morimoto Stars ===
The Morimoto Stars (Morimoto Sedai) is an informal term for the group of competitors who emerged post-Yusuke Morimoto's first kanzenseiha and are now some of the most consistently strong competitors. The members are usually considered to be Yusuke Morimoto, Tatsuya Tada, Keitaro Yamamoto, Jun Sato and Naoyuki Araki.

=== Celebrities ===
Celebrity competitors include:

- Kanna Asakura, mixed martial artist (38, 40)
- Miki Ando, figure skater (39-40)
- René Casselly, circus performer and television personality (37, 41)
- Henry Cejudo, MMA Fighter/Olympic athlete (21)
- Koriki Choshu, comedian (15, 18-20, 24)
- Kenji Darvish, air drummer and member of Golden Bomber (28, 30-39, 41-42)
- Gervasio Deferr, Olympic gymnast (10)
- Tetsurō Degawa, comedian (19, 23-24)
- Yoshikazu Fujita, rugby player (38, 40)
- Kazue Fukiishi, aka Box Lady
- Fuwa-chan, comedian and YouTuber (39-41)
- Jessie Graff, stunt performer (34, 37, 40)
- Morgan Hamm, Olympic gymnast (14-15)
- Paul Hamm, Olympic gymnast (14-16)
- Yoku Hata, comedian ("Guitar Samurai") (18-19)
- Hikakin, YouTuber (39-40, 42-43)
- Yeo Hong-chul, Olympic gymnast (7-8, 11-12)
- Hori, impressionist (22-24)
- Kota Ibushi, professional wrestler (31-33)
- Yukio Iketani, Olympic gymnast (1, 20, 24-25)
- Hikaru Iwamoto, member of Snow Man (33-42)
- Jordan Jovtchev, Olympic gymnast (8, 12, 14-16, 20, 23)
- Eiko Kano, comedian (23-24, 26)
- Toshiaki Kasuga, comedian (22, 24, 38-40)
- Yoshio Kojima, comedian (22, 24, 26-28)
- Kane Kosugi, actor (1, 4, 6-8, 40, 42)
- Yutaka Kyan, air guitarist and member of Golden Bomber (31-33, 35-36, 39-41, 43)
- Tomohiro Matsunaga, Olympic wrestler (21-22)
- Daisuke Miyazaki, handballer (20-22, 26)
- Wataru Mori, actor (16, 21, 32-37)
- Olivia Munn, actress and television personality (21-22)
- Shinsuke Nakamura, professional wrestler (14)
- Akiyoshi Nakao, actor (20, 22)
- Kinnikun Nakayama, actor and comedian (8-13, 15, 27-30, 33)
- Daisuke Nakata, Olympic trampolinist (8-13, 16-17, 21)
- Naoto, member of Exile (26)
- Andy Ologun, mixed martial artist (18, 20)
- Bobby Ologun, mixed martial artist (22)
- Kevin Pereira, television personality (21)
- Rinne Sugeta, member of 7 Men Samurai (38-43)
- Tetsuji Sakakibara, actor, singer and member of Yoshimotozaka46 (23-26)
- Dandy Sakano, comedian (24-25)
- Shōei, actor (6-8)
- Hisatsugu Suzuki, Olympic sprinter (13)
- Hiroshi Tanahashi, professional wrestler (15, 17)
- Hikaru Tanaka, Olympic gymnast (2-3)
- Paul Terek, Olympic decathlete (17, 19, 22, 24)
- Ryoichi Tsukada, member of A.B.C-Z (31-41)
- Olivia Vivian, Olympic gymnast (42)
- Ryosuke Yamamoto, actor (30-31)
- Passion Yara, comedian (16, 21)

== Reporter ==
Further additions to this section are desired. Bold indicates TBS announcers at the time of broadcast.

- Akizawa Junko (Episode 1)
- Kawahara Minami (Episode 1)
- An Yumiko (Episode 1)
- Mochizuki Rie (Episodes 2-3)
- Kurihara Yuka (Episodes 2-4)
- Miura Satoko (Episodes 4-5)
- Murakami Chinami (Episodes 5-8)
- Mae Chiaki (Episode 6)
- Tokoyo Akiko (Episodes 7-8, 11, 13, 31-37)
- Takeuchi Kanae (Episodes 9, 12)
- Ishiyama Aiko (Episodes 9, 13, 15)
- Yamada Airi (Episode 10) )
- Taeko Kodama (10th)
- Ako Kawada (11th, 14th-16th)
- Yuko Nakagawa (12th)
- Reika Nakazawa (14th)
- Yuriko Takahata (16th, 18th, 20th-24th)
- Mayumi Mizuno (17th)
- So Hirosawa (17th-18th)
- Nao Utahara (19th)
- Kazuha Sakiyama (19th-20th, 23rd-26th)
- Jun Yashiro (21st-22nd)
- Fumiyasu Sato (23rd [Note] 49)
- Maki Arai (24th)
- Aoi Ichikawa (25th)
- Erina Masuda (26th)
- Nagisa Sato (26th-27th)
- Mizuka (27th)
- Minami Tanaka (27th)
- Akise Yoshida (28th)
- Shaula Vogue (28th)
- Minaho Hayashi (28th-29th)
- Yumi Furuya (28th, 30th, 37th)
- Ai Eto (29th-30th)
- Yumiko Kobayashi (30th)
- Erina Arai (31st)
- Ruri Moriyama (32nd)
- Reina Minagawa (32nd)
- Ayaka Kawanishi (33rd-34th)
- Sayako Ito (35th)
- Kyoko Ito (36th)
- Junna Yamagata (36th)
- Natsuko Kondo (37th-42nd, World Cup 2024)
- Aika Okita (40th)
- Maine Sasaki (41st)
- Rina Shinohara (43rd, World Cup 2024 )
- Mitsuki Takayanagi (World Cup 2024)
- Mera Urano (42nd
- Nana Mitarai (43rd

== Results ==
In its 43 editions, all four stages of the course have been completed a total of only six times, by four different competitors. These were Kazuhiko Akiyama in the 4th competition (1999), Makoto Nagano in the 17th competition (2006), Yuuji Urushihara in the 24th (2010) and 27th (2011) competitions, and Yusuke Morimoto in the 31st (2015) and 38th (2020) competitions.

== Sasuke World Cup ==
Sasuke World Cup (Japanese: SASUKE(サスケ)ワールドカップ) is a special international tournament of Sasuke, based on American Ninja Warrior: USA vs. The World, which was the special international tournament of American Ninja Warrior. This tournament featured seven teams, including three teams representing Japan and four teams representing four countries that have their local shows based on Sasuke, including Team USA (representing American Ninja Warrior), Team Germany (representing Ninja Warrior Germany), Team France (representing Ninja Warrior France), Team Australia (representing Australian Ninja Warrior) and Team Poland (representing Ninja Warrior Polska).

== Merchandise ==
=== Book ===
Prior to the 41st tournament of Sasuke, on November 10, 2023, TBS announced the very first Sasuke Official Book (SASUKE公式BOOK), a 144-page book which was released on December 14, 2023 worldwide at the price of ¥1650. As an exclusive bonus, trading cards of various prominent Sasuke competitors would also be included upon purchasing the book. A promotional video was released on the official YouTube channel a day before the release date.

The book contains exclusive interviews and round table discussions from multiple prominent competitors such as Yamada Katsumi, Morimoto Yūsuke, Nagano Makoto, Yamamoto Shingo, Darvish Kenji, Kane Kosugi, Akiyama Kazuhiko, Urushihara Yuuji, Matachi Ryo, Kawaguchi Tomohiro, and Hioki Masashi. This also includes exclusive interviews from Sasuke Producer Inui Masato and Lead Commentator Sugiyama Shinya. For the first time since its inception, the book would also cover every official result from the past 40 Sasuke tournaments, including results that were initially cut from broadcast.

=== Manga ===
On December 26, 2023, TBS announced a new survival manga adaptations based on Sasuke, called Yomigaeri no Sasuke (ヨミガエリのサスケ). This manga will be distributed by Manga Box and was released on August 17, 2024.

=== Video games ===
Early in Sasuke's broadcasts, Konami produced a Java-based Sasuke game for the i-Mode mobile platform in Japan. The courses were updated following each season for at least a decade. In 2010, SEAMS produced a iOS-based Sasuke game, called SASUKE Challenger in Japan only. In 2024, PULSE INC. produced eSASUKE, which was a map based on Sasuke for their open world online game called Inspix World, marking the first Sasuke video game to be published in Windows and Android.

Nine official home video game releases with Sasuke have occurred, typically as a single game mode under the banner of Sasuke's parent show Kinniku Banzuke.

Title	Platform	Developed by	Based on:	Release
筋肉番付GB〜挑戦者はキミだ！〜 Kinniku Banzuke GB ~Chousen Monoha Kimida!~	Game Boy	Konami	Sasuke 3	25 November 1999
筋肉番付〜Road to Sasuke〜 Kinniku Banzuke ~Road to Sasuke~	PlayStation	Konami	Sasuke 4	27 April 2000
筋肉番付GB2〜目指せ！マッスルチャンピオン〜 Kinniku Banzuke GB2 ~Mokushi Semassuru Champion~	Game Boy	Konami	Sasuke Junior 4	10 August 2000
筋肉番付GB3〜新世紀サバイバル列伝！〜 Kinniku Banzuke GB3 ~Shinseiki Survival Retsuden!~	Game Boy	Konami	Sasuke 6	22 February 2001
筋肉番付 マッスルウォーズ21; Kinniku Banzuke: Muscle Wars 21	PlayStation 2	Konami	Sasuke 6	9 August 2001
筋肉番付〜決めろ！奇跡の完全制覇〜 Kinniku Banzuke ~Kimero! Kiseki no Kanzen Seiha~	Game Boy Advance	Konami	Sasuke 7	6 December 2001
マッスルちゃんぴよん 〜筋肉島の決戦〜 Muscle Champion ~Muscle Island Battle~	GameCube	Konami	Various	21 November 2002
Sasuke&筋肉バトルスポーツマンNo. 1決定戦; Sasuke & Kinniku Battle Sportman No. 1	Plug and Play	Epoch Co.	Sasuke 11	22 July 2006
極！筋肉スタジアム！サスケ完全制覇; Kyoukyoku Kinniku Stadium! Sasuke Kanzenseiha	Plug and Play	Epoch Co.	Sasuke 19; Kunoichi 7	19 July 2008
SASUKE Challenger	iOS	SEAMS	Sasuke 23	31 March 2010
eSASUKE	Windows, Android, iOS	PULSE INC.	Various	25 December 2024

== See also ==
- Kinniku Banzuke (known in the United States as Unbeatable Banzuke)
- Kunoichi (women's version of Sasuke)
- Viking: The Ultimate Obstacle Course
- Sarutobi Sasuke
- Australian Ninja Warrior
- Ninja Warrior Germany
- Ninja Warrior UK
- American Ninja Warrior
- Sasuke Ninja Warrior Indonesia
- Sasuke Vietnam
