= Sportsman No.1 (series) =

Japanese television series

Pro Sportsman No. 1 (最強の男は誰だ!壮絶筋肉バトル!!スポーツマンNo.1決定戦, Saikyō no Otoko wa Dare da! Sōzetsu Kinniku Batoru!! Supōtsuman Nanbā Wan Ketteisen; "Who is the Strongest Man?! Grand Muscle Battle!! Sportsman No. 1 Decisive Battle"), later revived as Sports Danshi Grand Prix (究極の男は誰だ!?最強スポーツ男子頂上決戦) abbreviated as SpoDan (スポダン) was an annual program made by Monster9, the same company that produced series such as Kinniku Banzuke and SASUKE and broadcast on TBS TV.

== Core installments ==
=== Pro Sportsman No.1 Ketteisen (1993–2009) ===
The original series that began as a pilot in 1993. A group of professional athletes competes in a modified pentathlon or heptathlon of events that combine strength, balance, speed and general athletics.

=== Geinōjin Survival Battle (1996–2007) ===
A spinoff of Pro Sportsman No.1 that retains the same general formula, with shorter overall runtimes and a lineup consisting entirely of athletics celebrities.

=== Sports Danshi Grand Prix (2012–present) ===
A reboot of the series produced after the dissolution of former production studio Sportsman No.1, Sports Danshi Grand Prix features a mix of athletes, former champions and celebrities together. The series was retitled due to an ongoing legal dispute with former producer Ushio Higuchi and his studio GoldEggs.

== Other series ==
=== Battle of the Four Kings (1995), Power Sportsman (1996) and Kairiki Battlefield (2022) ===
A series of tournaments under the same core concept as Sportsman No.1, with the competitor pool made up of Sumo wrestlers and Strongmen.

=== Amateur Sportsman (1995-1996) ===
A side series produced in conjunction with the Japanese Olympic Committee under the working title Clash of Olympians. In this case, amateur refers to athletes who are not being paid in professional leagues, rather than true amateur. The lineup is consistently most of current and former Olympians, and is widely referred to as "Olympian Sportsman" among fans.

=== Speed Sportsman (1996) ===
A one-time special that featured exclusively high-speed events revolving around running. This tournament is notable for having the debut of the now iconic event Shotgun Touch.

=== Queens Challenge Battle (2002–2004) ===
A women's spinoff of Sportsman No.1 that features a group of women taking on modified events.

=== Glory Sportsman (2010) ===
A one-time special that featured a large lineup of 50 competitors attempting the Monster Box.

=== Noniku Battle Atamaccho (2012) ===
A one-time special that featured a pair competing together on modified events that feature traditional Sportsman events mixed with intellectual aspects.

=== Strongman No.1 (2023–2024) ===
Airing as a special during the final three specials of Honoo-no Taiiku-kai TV, Strongman No.1 saw seven professional athletes in different fields competing for the title. In addition, a team composed of four Taiiku Kai TV staff who competed alongside the professionals.

== Winners ==
Overall	Series		Overview			
Overall	Division	Season	Winner	Num of Events	Score	Broadcast
1	Pro	—	Yukio Tanaka	5	138	29 December 1993
2	Pro	1	Tetsuya Iida	7	345	1 January 1995
3	Olympian	1	—	5	—	29 March 1995
4	Olympian	2	—	5	—	5 October 1995
EX1	BFK	—	Koji Murofushi	3	—	16 December 1995
5	Pro	2	Makoto Hasegawa	6	500	2 January 1996
EX2	Speed	—	Tetsuya Iida	3	1100	27 January 1996
EX3	Power	—	Nobuhiko Takada	3	550	17 February 1996
6	Celebrity	1	Daisuke Shima	5	578	2 April 1996
7	Olympian	3	Koji Murofushi	3	220	2 October 1996
8	Pro	3	Kazuo Matsui	5	69	2 January 1997
9	Celebrity	2	Kane Kosugi	5	560	2 April 1997
10	Pro	4	Koichi Ogata	8	550	1 January 1998
11	Celebrity	3	Kane Kosugi	7	950	1 April 1998
12	Celebrity	4	Kane Kosugi	7	810	2 October 1998
13	Pro	5	Tetsuya Iida	7	380	1 January 1999
14	Celebrity	5	Naoki Iketani	6	620	26 March 1999
15	Pro	6	Kane Kosugi	7	385	1 January 2000
16	Celebrity	6	Kane Kosugi	6	685	24 March 2000
17	Celebrity	7	Kane Kosugi	6	446	10-14 October 2000
18	Pro	7	Daisuke Ohata	8	580	1 January 2001
19	Celebrity	8	Shōei	6	614	23 March 2001
20	Pro	8	Koji Murofushi	8	565	1 January 2002
21	Celebrity	9	Shōei	8	522	27 March 2002
22	Celebrity	10	Masaru Nagai	6	476	27 September 2002
EX4	Queens	1	Yuko Mizuno	2	200	27 September 2002
23	Pro	9	Daisuke Ohata	8	630	1 January 2003
24	Celebrity	11	Kinnikun Nakayama	6	544	31 March 2003
EX5	Queens	2	Yuko Mizuno	3	250	31 March 2003
25	Celebrity	12	Naoki Iketani	7	715	26 September 2003
26	Pro	10	Taka Miura	8	455	1 January 2004
EX6	Queens	3	Yuko Mizuno	3	240	24 March 2004
27	Celebrity	13	Naoki Iketani	7	560	5 April 2004
28	Pro	11	Naoki Iketani	8	490	1 January 2005
29	Celebrity	14	Kinnikun Nakayama	6	600	8 April 2005
30	Celebrity	15	Kinnikun Nakayama	5	295	28 September 2005
31	Pro	12	Daisuke Miyazaki	6	375	1 January 2006
32	Celebrity	16	Kinnikun Nakayama	6	550	29 March 2006
33	Celebrity	17	Kinnikun Nakayama	5	585	4 October 2006
34	Pro	13	Paul Terek	7	470	1 January 2007
35	Celebrity	CB	Wacky	5	405	30 March 2007
36	Celebrity	18	Wacky	5	455	5 October 2007
37	Pro	14	Daisuke Miyazaki	7	480	1 January 2008
38	Pro	15	Daisuke Miyazaki	6	395	3 January 2009
39	Special	—	Hirokazu Ōyama	5	340	7 January 2010
40	Grand Prix	1	Gaku Sano	5	340	21 November 2012
41	Grand Prix	2	Wataru Mori	6	423	11 April 2013
42	Grand Prix	3	Mandy Sekiguchi	6	485	29 December 2013
43	Grand Prix	4	Mandy Sekiguchi	6	575	23 December 2014
44	Grand Prix	5	Gaku Sano	6	400	23 December 2015
45	Grand Prix	6	Gaku Sano	6	450	10 October 2016
46	Grand Prix	7	Mandy Sekiguchi	4	310	1 January 2017
47	Grand Prix	8	Yuki Nomura	5	465	11 May 2017
48	Grand Prix	9	Yuki Nomura	5	335	28 September 2017
49	Grand Prix	10	—	3	—	1 January 2018
50	Grand Prix	11	Kaisei Takechi	6	510	22 March 2022
EX7	Kairiki	—				28 March 2022
EX8	Kairiki	—				7 August 2022
EX9	Strongman	1	Akihito Yamada	4	210	23 September 2023
EX10	Strongman	2	Taiiku-kai TV team	4	250	16 December 2023
EX11	Strongman	3	Akihiko Nakamura	4	220	16 March 2024
51	Grand Prix	12	Kaisei Takechi	4	300	3 May 2024
52	Grand Prix	13	Kaisei Takechi	4	270	14 October 2024
EX12	Taiikusai	—	—	3	—	31 December 2024
53	Grand Prix	14	Yoshiyuki Yamamoto	4	270	2 May 2025
54	Grand Prix	15	Yoshiyuki Yamamoto	4	300	21 December 2025
