= Chōbyō =

Chōbyō is a Japanese masculine given name that may refer to

- Chōbyō Yara (屋良 朝苗, 1902–1997), Japanese politician
- Passion Yara (パッション屋良, born Chōbyō Yara (屋良 朝苗) in 1976), Japanese comedian
