= Tomoko Kaneda =

Japanese voice actress and radio personality (born 1973)

- 金田 朋子
- Born: May 29, 1973 (age 53); Yokohama, Kanagawa, Japan
- Occupations: Voice actress; radio personality
- Years active: 2000–present
- Agent: Across Entertainment
- Height: 147.7 cm (4 ft 10 in)
- Spouse: Wataru Mori (m. 2013; div. 2024)
- Children: 1

Tomoko Kaneda (金田 朋子, Kaneda Tomoko; born May 29, 1973) is a Japanese voice actress and radio personality from Yokohama, Japan. She had worked at Aoni Production for eleven years and freelance since April 2011; in August 2011, it was announced that she transferred to Across Entertainment. She graduated from Department of Architecture, Kanto Gakuin University. She is a member of the voice acting unit Drops, which included fellow voice actresses Mariko Kouda, Akemi Kanda, Ai Nonaka and Ryoko Shiraishi, and of the voice acting unit SD-Children along with Miyu Matsuki.

Her casting is usually that of a young child, due to her high-pitched voice. She says in her blog's introduction, "My voice hardly changes even if I breathe in the helium gas." When she was 29 years old, her height was 146 cm (4 ft 9.4). However, by the time she turned 37 years old, her height was 150 cm (4 ft 11). On November 21, 2013, she announced her marriage to actor Wataru Mori. On July 13, 2017, she gave birth to her first child, a girl. They divorced on July 20, 2024.

== Notable filmography ==
- Tanya and Misia in Sci-Fi HARRY (2000)
- Botan in Go! Go! Itsutsugo Land (2001)
- Akaha Okajima in Kokoro Library (2001)
- Yuri Abe in Kasumin (2001)
- Culumon (Calumon) in Digimon Tamers (2001)
- Chiyo Mihama in Azumanga Daioh (2002)
- Bonta-kun in Full Metal Panic? Fumoffu! (2003)
- Ebi in Girls Bravo (2004)
- Akubi in Akubi Girl (2006)
- Asu Yamada in Binbō Shimai Monogatari (2006)
- Peach in Demashita! Powerpuff Girls Z (2006)
- Nene in Bakugan Battle Brawlers (2007)
- Nelliel Tu Odelschwanck in Bleach/Bleach: Thousand-Year Blood War (2007, 2022–present)
- Aoi Oribe in Myself ; Yourself
- Boa Sandersonia (young) in One Piece (2009)
- Culumon (Calumon) in Digimon Savers 3D: The Digital World in Imminent Danger! (2009)
- Naho in Naruto Shippuden (2011)
- Ruka (Luca) in Digimon Fusion (2011)
- Chica in Doraemon (2012)
- Sorbe in Shining Hearts: Shiawase no Pan (2012)
- Potclean in Hunter × Hunter (2011) (2013)
- 033H in Space Dandy (2014)
- Misato Wakana in My Wife is the Student Council President (2015)
- Momotarou in Kamiwaza Wanda (2016)
- Japanese crested ibis (Ep. 3, 5, 12) in Kemono Friends (2017)
- Keshi in The Morose Mononokean II (2019)
- Satan in Police x Heroine Lovepatrina! (2020)
- Dori in Genshin Impact (2022)
- Masukuma in The Little Lies We All Tell (2022)
- Misako and Coron in Junji Ito Maniac: Japanese Tales of the Macabre (2023)
- Silver Moon Princess in Sorcerous Stabber Orphen: Sanctuary Arc (2023)
- Mokomoko Dannoura in My Instant Death Ability Is So Overpowered (2024)
- Yо̄ in Crayon Shin-chan the Movie: Our Dinosaur Diary (2024)
- Fuchikoma in The Ghost in the Shell (2026)

Unknown date

- Cynthia and Grace in Hanaukyo Maid Team
- U.S Army Recruit in Magical Marine Pixel Maritan
- Marie in Onegai Teacher and Onegai Twins
- Gyokuyo in Juuni Kokki (The Twelve Kingdoms)
- Tsubame Tsubakura (Terry) in Battle B-Daman
- Fuku in Tenchi Muyo! GXP
- Kinkin in Crayon Shin-chan: The Storm Called: The Hero of Kinpoko
- Dororon, Pine-chan, and Kabi Run-Run in Soreike! Anpanman (Go! Anpanman) /Anpanman
- Soccer ball in Sensei no Ojikan/Doki Doki School Hours
- Eriko in Chibi Maruko-chan
- Chiquitita in Shining Force Neo
- Daisuke Niwa (young) in D.N.Angel
- PyuPyu in Fushigiboshi no Futagohime
- Dengaku Man in Bobobo-bo Bo-bobo
- Scarlet Claw in Re:Cutie Honey
- ShiroBon/White Bomber in Bomberman Jetters
- Ryo in Ninin Ga Shinobuden
- Kuniko Touya in Detective School Q
- Fuyuno Yoshikawa in Magikano
- Laetitia in Madlax
- Mayuko Kamikawa in Sola
- Lulu (child) in Kamisama Kazoku
- Satori Sarutobi in My Bride Is a Mermaid (OVA)
- Mafuyu Shimotsuki in Rakka Ryūsui (Drama CD)
- Hiruko in Shangri-La
- Dacy Dalstrin in Lunia
- Gretel in Black Lagoon
- Shantak-kun in Haiyore! Nyarko-san (Drama CD)
- In-chan and You-chan in The Cosmopolitan Prayers
- Desertrians in HeartCatch PreCure!
- Puu in Go! Princess PreCure The Movie: Go! Go!! Splendid Triple Feature!!!
- Belbel in Petite Princess Yucie
- Lavi in Sgt. Frog
- Inn Worker in Seto No Hanayome (Ep. 18)
- Nami-kozo in GeGeGe no Kitaro
- Chiharu Shigeno in MAJOR 5th season
- Delusion Eucliwood #3 in Kore wa Zombie Desu ka?
- Mike in Sketchbook ~full color'S~
- Goemon Hachisuka in The Ambition of Oda Nobuna
- Telelin in Tamagotchi!
- Oshiri Kajiri Mushi XVIII in Oshiri Kajiri Mushi
- Peacock in Skullgirls

Video games

- Final Fantasy series (Moogle)
- Osouji Sentai Clean Keeper (Mari)
- Mario Sports Mix (Moogle)
- Fire Emblem (Palla, Marisa)
- Genshin Impact (Dori)
- Puyo Puyo Tetris 2 (Carbuncle)
- Goddess of Victory: Nikke (Chime)

=== Dubbing ===
- I Am Sam (Lucy Diamond Dawson (Dakota Fanning))

== CD ==
=== Singles ===
- Tomodachi no umi (Culumon in Digimon)
- The Biggest Dreamer (Culumon in Digimon)
- Sekai wa NEOHAPPY (Azumanga Daioh character CD Vol.1 Chiyo Mihama)
- Nemurihime (Sleeping beauty) (DROPS)
- Koi no American football (DROPS)
- Furarekibunde Rock'n' Roll (DROPS)
- Musumegokoro★Otomegokoro / Sports shimasyo♥ (SD★Children)
- Ai no Senko (SD★Children)
- Sai Trichromatic
- BLEACH BEAT COLLECTION 3rd SESSION: 05 NEL TU
- Aoitori (Bluebird) (Myself; Yourself character songs Vol.5 Aoi Oribe)
- Warunai fever
- The Ambition of Nobuna Oda – Utahime 01 Music of the different world (Hachisuka Goemon in OdaNobuna No Yabou)

=== Soundtracks ===
- Digimon timers song Carnival (Culumon in Digimon)
- Azumanga Daioh original Soundtrack vol.2 (Chiyo Mihama)
- Hanaukyo Maid-tai La Verite Drama CD Morning hen
- Caramel! Police Academy character songs
- GROW LANSER IV original character song Albums
- Myself;Yourself~Audio Drama CD~
- Guardian Hearts power up ! Sound Collection (SD★Children)

=== Albums ===
- CAN DROPS (DROPS)
- Hyakka SAY!RUN! Josei seiyū hen II (百歌声爛 －女性声優編II－) SVWC-7526
- Rune Princess Vocal Album
- W -Wish- character mini Album 3 Tomo & Saika
- Miyu Matssuki & Tomoko Kaneda RADIO DEKOPIN night anniversary disc (松来未祐と金田朋子のRADIOデコピンないと anniversary disc)
- CD □□□(Kuchi-Ro-Ro)

== Online game songs ==
- Twenty-Two (STREET GEARS)

== Stage ==
- Gekidan-TENNEN-KOBO Ope-nimo-makezu (16–20 September 2010)
- Gekidan-TENNEN-KOBO Peach Boys (8–12 June 2011)

== Radio ==
- Radio Dot I: Tomoko Kanada's mini-mini-micro kindergarten
- ES Hour Radio no Ojikan
- Tomoko Kanada's mini-mini-micro electronic kindergarten
- Club AT-X Yappari Anime ga suki.
- Miyu Matssuki & Tomoko Kaneda RADIO DEKOPIN night
- Cyoo・ULTRA Super-mania new Radio wish group
- DROPS senpercent
- Miyu Matssuki & Tomoko Kaneda RADIO DEKOPIN night 2
- Super-dash station Mai Nakahara & Tomoko Kanada's heat Radi
- Nijichiu Parade
- Miyu Matssuki & Tomoko Kaneda RADIO DEKOPIN night 2.5
- Pixel Maritan peacekeeping RADIO
- Miyu Matssuki & Tomoko Kaneda RADIO DEKOPIN night SP
- Tomoko Kaneda & Makoto Yasumura's Air radio
- Tomoko Kaneda's Tobidoogu
- Faito ippatsu! Jûden chan!! Tensai Puragu no Genki ga deru Radio!!
