= Viking: The Ultimate Obstacle Course =

- Viking (バイキング)
- Genre: Sports entertainment Obstacle course
- Country of origin: Japan
- Original language: Japanese
- No. of seasons: 7

Production
- Producer: Monster9
- Production locations: Tokyo Bay, Japan

Original release
- Network: Fuji TV
- Release: April 3, 2005 – March 25, 2007

Related
- Sasuke; Kunoichi; Pro Sportsman No.1; Kinniku Banzuke (Muscle Ranking)

Viking: The Ultimate Obstacle Course (海筋肉王 ～バイキング～, Kaikinnikuō ~Baikingu~; literally Sea Muscle King Viking), sometimes abbreviated to Viking: TUOC, is a Japanese obstacle course endurance game show using an obstacle course produced by Fuji TV and Monster9. The English version of Viking is produced by ESPN2 with two American commentators calling the action. In Europe it airs on Eurosport 2 with the American commentators in the first season and British commentator Colin Bryce in the second. In the Philippines, Viking was aired in TV5 and hosted by Brod Pete, Richard del Rosario, and Gabe Mercardo. In Taiwan on JET TV in its original form with Chinese subtitles and Thailand on Channel 9 MCOT in Thai program "แชมป์ เฉือน แชมป์" (Champ VS Champ) in 2009, later this program are broadcast other Japanese game show like Original Iron Chef, Unbeatable Banzuke and Sasuke Ninja Warrior (It is mainly broadcast with the Original Japan such as Sasuke, broadcast along with Kunoichi sometimes and later American Ninja Warrior was broadcast instead of Original Japan version). The entire show is broadcast from Tokyo Bay.

== Summary ==
The object of the show is to complete a giant obstacle course that tests the body and mind of 50 contestants for each show. Round by round, the contestants that do not get eliminated advance to the next round. There are 4 grueling stages called "1st Marine", "2nd Adventure", "3rd Fantasy" and "Final Viking". Whoever survives "Final Viking" is crowned the Ultimate Survivor. Obstacles change during each of the stages except for Final Viking at the end.

== Stages ==
=== 1st Marine Stage ===
Comp #	Marine Stage Obstacles									Time Limit
1	Odysseys	Loading Docks	Castaway		Main Deck	Maths Parley	Cannonball Run	Swing Mast	Captain's Cabin	120.0
2	Odysseys	Loading Docks	Castaway		Main Deck	Maths Parley	Cannonball Run	Swing Mast	Captain's Cabin	110.0
3	Odysseys	Loading Docks	Alphabet Parley	Castaway	Island Escape	Maths Parley	Cannonball Run	Swing Mast	Captain's Cabin	135.0

=== 2nd Adventure Stage ===
Comp #	Adventure Stage Obstacles						Time Limit
1	Galleon	Galley	Rope Maze	Survival Flag or Survival Jump	Log Screw	Heavenly Climb	120.0
2	Galleon	Galley	Rope Maze	Survival Flag or Survival Jump	Log Screw	Heavenly Climb	120.0
3	Galleon	Colour Fusion	Rope Maze	Survival Flag or Survival Jump	Tactical Parley	Heavenly Climb	135.0

=== 3rd Fantasy Stage ===
Comp #	Fantasy Stage Obstacles		
1	Heartbreaker	Steady Voyager or Ultimate Plank	Bio Clock
2	Heartbreaker	Steady Voyager or Ultimate Plank	Bio Clock

=== Final Viking Stage ===
Comp #	Viking Stage Obstacles				Time Limit
1	Horizontal Rope (23m)		Vertical Rope (10m)		100.0
2	Horizontal Rope (23m)		Vertical Rope (10m)		100.0
3	Hawkeye	Steady Voyager	Ultimate Plank	Heartbreaker	None

== Obstacles ==
=== 1st Marine Stage ===
Each contestant has 1 minute 50 seconds (otherwise for men: 2 minutes 15 seconds; for the women: 2 minutes 22 seconds) to run from the start to stop the clock at the top by going through the obstacles.

- Odyssey: a tilting rotating platform that must be crossed.
- Loading Dock: a balance beam with three overhead conveyor belts. One 15 lb. bag drops from each, and the contestant must catch one of them and carry it across the balance beam. If they fail to catch a bag, the beam they are stood on rotates, tipping them into the water.
- Castaway: a zipline with a large globe which the competitor must grab that leads to a cargo net on the other side.
- Alphabet Parley: The contestant sits in a chair and a letter and a number appear on a screen. The contestant must speak out a letter in the English alphabet corresponding to the Parley board, for example if the Parley board reads "2 before X", the answer would be "V". An incorrect guess drops the contestant through a trapdoor and into the water.
- Math Parley: The contestant hits 2 buttons that stop 2 random number generators. The contestant must add these 2 numbers together and enter in the correct answer using a keypad. For example, 76 + 45 = 121. An incorrect guess drops the contestant through a trapdoor and into the water.
- Island Escape: a small island platform with a rope. The contestant must jump from a ledge and onto the island and use the rope to pull himself/herself across to the next obstacle.
- Main Deck: an area where the contestant must lay a balance beam into one of two holes. They have a choice between a wider and heavier beam requiring strength or a light thin beam that tests their balance. The contestant must pick either one to cross. This obstacle alternates with Island Escape.
- Cannonball: a bridge of 4 cannonballs suspended over the water which the contestant must cross. Sasuke took this obstacle and renamed it the Spin Bridge for the 27th tournament.
- Swing Mast: contestants throw a rope with a weight on the end around a beam in the air. Hopefully the rope will wrap around the beam allowing them to swing across onto a mat below. If the rope hasn't been thrown properly, it will come loose and the contestant would not make it to the mat.
- Captain's Cabin: a giant rotating ship's wheel with climbing spikes with the clock stopper at the top. The contestant must climb up to the top and press the clock stopper before the time expires.

=== 2nd Adventure Stage ===
The next round has the surviving contestants try to finish the course in under 2 minutes.

- Galleon: a walk on a balance beam and a rotating Y-shaped bridge while the contestant carries two 30-lb. buckets on a yoke on his/her back.
- Galley: a tunnel littered with spinning oars. Alternates with Color Fusion.
- Color Fusion: an area with a stopper that randomly makes two colors appear on a board. The contestant must then identify the color that is made when the two generated colors are mixed. Alternates with Galley.
- Rope Maze: a length of rope wrapped around an overhead maze as the contestant climbs and maneuvers it to cross to the other side. The Pole Maze in Sasuke is similar to this though it uses a pole instead of a rope.

Note: The two following obstacles will both be on the course and the contestant gets to choose which one they would like to do.

- Survival Flag: an area where the contestant must raise a weighted flag weighing 65 lbs up a pole
- Survival Jump: an area where the contestant must jump onto a trampoline and onto a log platform
- Tactical Parley: an area almost the same as Math Parley from the 1st Marine Stage, except the math problem is a subtraction problem instead of addition. An incorrect answer drops the contestant through a trapdoor. Alternates with Log Screw.
- Log Screw: a bridge of 1 rotating log and 2 parallel spinning logs. Contestants must cross to the other side using either parallel log. Alternates with Tactical Parley.
- Heavenly Climb: A climb up a pole near a rotating propeller towards a pipe beam where the contestant must cross and stop the clock.

Note: This ends the timed part of the 2nd Adventure Stage. The following obstacle, although referred as 3rd Fantasy Stage by ESPN2 and other broadcasting systems, is the 2nd part of the 2nd Adventure Stage.

- Heartbreaker: An upside-down stair-like cliff 25 feet high is climbed to jump across 7 feet to the other side where a sword is drawn out to signify the completion of the obstacle. In 2007, part of the obstacle was put in the 3rd stage of Sasuke and was renamed as the Spider Flip.

=== 3rd Fantasy Stage ===
Survivors of the Adventure Stage have to complete several parts of the Fantasy Stage to make it to Final Viking. There are no time limits in any of the parts except Hawkeye.

- Hawkeye: The contestant is shown a rotating wheel of letters with one number hidden among the characters. The contestant must identify the number in 10 seconds or be dropped through a trapdoor.
- Steady Voyager: The contestant balances a long metal pole on his/her hand and maneuvers the pole through an electrified metal maze above them. If the pole touches the metal edges, sparks will fly and the contestant is eliminated. This is similar to Unbeatable Banzuke's "Ottoto 9"
- Ultimate Plank: A giant pegboard sign that spells out VIKING and where contestants use two metal pegs and upper body strength to cross the entire word to the other side without using their legs during the run.
- Bio Clock: Similar to the 1st Marine Stage Math Parley, contestant stands on a trap door with a button in front of them. The clock starts ticking when the contestant presses the button and must stop within .5 seconds of 10 seconds (±.5) in order to proceed to the Final Viking. If the contestant fails, the trap door will open, causing the contestant to drop into the water below.

=== Final Viking ===
The Final Viking challenge has the remaining contestants scramble across a 75-foot horizontal rope and climb up a 30-foot vertical rope to the top. If the contestant makes it to the top in under 1 minute 40 seconds, they win. One man, Makoto Nagano, who was the only man ever to get to the Final Viking stage, came close but ran out of time when he was 5 feet away from the finish. No contestant has ever completed Final Viking; but if one does he or she will be crowned the Ultimate Viking. Nagano, incidentally, has completed the fourth and final stage of SASUKE (called Ninja Warrior in the US and UK), a similar obstacle course contest, which has featured many of the same contestants that have competed on Viking.

== Other versions ==
Viking also airs special editions of the show featuring revamped obstacle courses.

=== Family edition ===
This family version of Viking features 2 person teams (usually a parent and child, but occasionally a husband and wife) running the course. They must work as a team to get through the course helping each other to complete various obstacles. If either team member falls in the water, the team is eliminated. Children as young as 5 have competed on these episodes.

It consists of 3 (sometimes 4) stages.

- 1st Marine Stage

Comp #	Marine Stage Obstacles										Time Limit
1	Rendezvous	The Walls	Pipe Slider	Horse Vault	Geography Parley		Island Escape	Stilt Walk	Horizontal Bar	Final Slope	135.0
2	Rendezvous	The Walls	Pipe Slider	Horse Vault	Geography Parley		Island Escape	Stilt Walk	Horizontal Bar	Final Slope	111.0
3	Rendezvous	Great Dive	The Wall	Pipe Slider	Horse Vault	Maths Parley	The Raft	Stilt Walk	Underwater Net	Final Slope	150.0

- 2nd Adventure Stage - The two team members are attached together by a rope for this stage making it more difficult. Contains obstacles such as Equilibrium pathway (a.k.a. Each to His Own Way), Swinging hammers, Net leap and Vertical pole climb.
- 3rd Fantasy Stage- Only appears in one version of family Viking. Parent and Child must ride a tandem bicycle across a long thin beam over a pool of water to the other side.
- Final Viking - Different from other versions of Viking, the 2 best families from the 2nd Adventure Stage are flown out to Okinawa to complete a course built in the sea. The first family to complete the course wins a new car. The family that got the fastest time in the 2nd stage gets the right to attempt the Final Stage first. Obstacles include - Long balance beam, Climb the platform and Final swing.

=== Celebrity edition ===
This version of Viking features many Japanese celebrities competing against each other. Some of the events have been head to head races.

- 1st Marine Stage - 3 minutes. Including obstacles such as Odysseys, Pipe Slider, Raft Slide and Final Slopes. Unlike other versions of Viking, if a competitor falls in the water in this stage, they can carry on the course without any penalty.
- 2nd Adventure Stage - 1 minutes 15 seconds. A long pathway featuring 20 swinging hammers that try and knock the competitors off the pathway and into the water below. It's similar to Sasuke's Hammer Dodge. From this stage onwards, if a competitor falls in the water, they are eliminated from the competition.
- 3rd Fantasy Stage- 2 minutes. Features obstacles such as Castaway, Swing Mast and Cannonball Run.
- Final Viking - All celebrities that completed the 3rd fantasy stage must separately climb up a tall scaffolding tower and hit a button at the top. The celebrity who completes this in the fastest time wins.

Various celebrities take on the course, including television presenters, fighters, wrestlers and comedians.

=== International version ===
Region or Country	Local name	Host(s)	Network	Dates
South Korea	슈퍼바이킹	Unknown	KBS	November 4, 2006 - April 15, 2007

== Results ==
The following is a list of currently available information of people who managed to reach at least the Second Adventure Stage in each competition. Under each competition, the results are listed in order of who went the farthest first. Their names are listed along with their number (1-100) from the competition, and the obstacle/stage they failed to complete. The first Viking competition was a special competition where 80 celebrities and famous athletes competed. The 2nd Competition had 100 attempts at the First Marine Stage. The obstacles used in each competition as well as a description of each obstacle are listed above. The first two Viking competitions used "layout #1" listed above, while the third Viking tournament used "layout #2". All air dates are of the Japanese broadcast on Fuji TV. If there are two or more competitors who failed the same obstacle, then who made it farthest is listed first.

Note: There is a "Brain Ship Stage" which was a stage between the First Marine Stage and the Second Adventure Stage. Competitors would be split into two groups and would be given a series of numbers to memorize. After a few seconds the numbers would disappear, and competitors would write down the numbers on a piece of paper. The person with the most mistakes from each group would be eliminated. Due to bad weather, there was no Brain Ship Stage in the first competition.

=== 1st Competition ===
Aired: March 22, 2005

Competitor	Stage	Obstacle
No. 40 Kimihiro Minamide	Second Adventure Stage	Failed Rope Maze
No. 32 Yuta Yamazaki	Second Adventure Stage	Failed Rope Maze
No. 33 Kenta Yamazaki	Second Adventure Stage	Failed Rope Maze
No. 58 Teru	Second Adventure Stage	Failed Galleon
No. 76 Hiromitsu Takahashi	Second Adventure Stage	Failed Galleon

=== 2nd Competition ===
Aired: April 4, 2005

Competitor	Stage	Obstacle
No. 90 Makoto Nagano	Final Viking	Failed Vertical Rope
No. 81 Teru	Second Adventure Stage	Failed Heartbreaker
No. 62 Manabu Sato	Second Adventure Stage	Failed Heavenly Climb
No. 61 Hiroyuki Asaoka	Second Adventure Stage	Failed Heavenly Climb
No. 74 Kimihiro Minamide	Second Adventure Stage	Failed Rope Maze
No. 96 Hiromitsu Takahashi	Second Adventure Stage	Failed Rope Maze
No. 54 Tomoyuki	Second Adventure Stage	Failed Rope Maze
No. 63 Yuhei Fukuda	Second Adventure Stage	Failed Rope Maze
No. 97 Terukazu Ishikawa	Brain Ship Stage	Failed Brain Ship Stage
No. 73 Kosuke Yamaguchi	Brain Ship Stage	Failed Brain Ship Stage

=== 3rd Competition ===
Aired: October 4, 2005

Competitor	Stage	Obstacle
No. 71 Kimihiro Minamide	Final Viking	Failed Ultimate Plank
No. 80 Sho Maeda	Final Viking	Failed Steady Voyager
No. 76 Yushi Inagaki	Second Adventure Stage	Failed Tactical Parley
No. 45 Hiromitsu Takahashi	Second Adventure Stage	Failed Rope Maze
No. 100 Hiromichi Sato	Second Adventure Stage	Failed Color Fusion
No. 97 Teru	Second Adventure Stage	Withdrew*

- Teru landed too rough on Swing Mast and his leg felt the effect during the stage transition and couldn't recover

== See also ==
- Kinniku Banzuke
- Sasuke (TV series)
- Obstacle course
- Viking on Japanese Wiki
