= Daisuke Nakata =

Japanese trampoline gymnast (born 1974)

- Born: March 2, 1974 (age 52) Mikawa, Ishikawa
- Height: 165 cm (5 ft 5 in)

Gymnastics career
- Discipline: Trampoline gymnastics
- Country represented: Japan

Daisuke Nakata (中田 大輔, Nakata Daisuke; born March 2, 1974 in Mikawa, Ishikawa, Japan) is a trampoline gymnast who competed for Japan in the 2000 Summer Olympics. Daisuke also performs on SASUKE (known in America as Ninja Warrior), where he is one of the most well-known competitors. On the trampoline, Nakata can jump as high as 26 feet.

== Sasuke ==
Along with training for the Olympics he also trains for the aforementioned SASUKE. He made his debut in the 8th competition in September 2001 and was able to make it to the 2nd Stage, where he ended up timing out on the Wall Lift. From the 9th to the 11th competitions, he made it to the Third Stage of each tournament, but wound up failing on the Globe Grasp obstacle all three times in a row. After the 13th competition in April 2004 (where an ankle injury was the cause of Nakata not being able to advance past the 2nd stage), Nakata missed SASUKE for several tournaments because he was in a hit-and-run accident later that year; his hands and wrists were seriously hurt and his grip suffered. His grip strength has failed to return to normal and his wrists remain crooked despite several surgeries. He finally returned to SASUKE to compete in the 16th and 17th competition, held in 2005 and 2006. In the 16th he ran out of time in the first stage but in the 17th he made it to the 3rd stage once again, but the pain in his hands was too much for him and he lost his grip on the 3rd Stage's first obstacle, the Arm Rings. He then left SASUKE for another two years before coming back to compete in the 21st competition (September 2008). He made it to the 2nd Stage again, but re-injured his wrists after falling onto the landing pad of the Downhill Jump. The pain was so immense that he could not overcome the next obstacle, which was the Salmon Ladder.

Nakata has not had enough strength to go to the Final Stage yet, despite having gone to the 3rd Stage four times. Nakata has admitted that lack of upper body strength is his weakness. In the 9 tournaments he has entered to date, he has only failed the 1st Stage twice, that being in the 12th competition (October 2003) when he unexpectedly failed on the Rolling Log obstacle and in the 16th where he ran out of time.

=== SASUKE results ===
- 8th competition (46) - Failed Wall Lifting - 2nd Stage
- 9th competition (71) - Failed Lamp Grasper - 3rd Stage
- 10th competition (940)^ - Failed Lamp Grasper - 3rd Stage
- 11th competition (95) - Failed Lamp Grasper - 3rd Stage
- 12th competition (94) - Failed Rolling Log - 1st Stage
- 13th competition (71) - Failed Wall Lifting - 2nd Stage
- 14th-15th competitions - did not compete
- 16th competition (65) - Failed Rope Climb - 1st Stage
- 17th competition (96) - Failed Arm Rings - 3rd Stage
- 18th-20th competitions - did not compete
- 21st competition (88) - Failed Salmon Ladder - 2nd Stage

^ In the 10th competition, the numbering system for the contestants ran from 901-1000 to indicate that 1000 competitors had attempted SASUKE's 1st Stage. Under the normal system, Nakata would have been number 40.

== Sportsman No.1 ==
Like several of SASUKE competitors during Monster9 years, Nakata invited and competed in 4 of 15 (39 overall) Pro Sportsman No.1 tournaments, one of his appearances have third place finisher.

== Other appearances ==
Nakata also appeared in Nirgilis' Promo Video for "Brand New Day". He performed in "Muscle Musical".
