= Daisuke Miyazaki (handballer) =

Japanese handball player (born 1981)

Personal information
- Nationality: Japanese
- Born: 6 June 1981 (age 45) Ōita, Ōita, Japan
- Height: 1.73 m (5 ft 8 in)

Sport
- Sport: Handball
- Position: Left wing
- Current club: Osaki Osol

Senior clubs
- Years: Team
- 2003–2009: Osaki Osol
- 2009–2010: BM Alcobendas
- 2010–2019: Osaki Osol
National team
Years	Team	Apps	(Gls)
–	Japan	133	(589)

Daisuke Miyazaki (宮崎 大輔, Miyazaki Daisuke) (born 6 June 1981) is a Japanese handball player for Osaki Osol and the Japanese national team. He played for BM Alcobendas in 09/10 season.

He represented Japan at the 2019 World Men's Handball Championship.

He has competed in Pro Sportsman No. 1 five times. He has won three times in 2006, 2008 and 2009. He came close in 2007, resulting in 4th place, with Paul Terek as the winner, and in 2010 he failed the 20th level. Miyazaki has also competed in the Japanese television series Sasuke. He competed four times (Sasuke 20–22, 26). In Sasuke 20, he was one of many to fail the new Half-Pipe Attack obstacle in the First Stage. However, in Sasuke 21, he completed the First Stage with less than a second left. He had more success on the Second Stage, breezing through the obstacles, and though he struggled on the Wall Lifting at the end, he completed with 10.3 seconds left. He however struggled on the Third Stage, struggling with the first two obstacles. He ultimately failed the Devil Steps, this being the earliest Third Stage failure of Shin-Sasuke (excluding Shingo Yamamoto's failure due to injury). Miyazaki competed once more in Sasuke 22, however timed out just metres from the finish of the First Stage. He competed yet again, in Sasuke 26, but failed a new obstacle in Stage 1, the Rolling Escargot. According to Japan National Police Agency official confirmed reported, he was detained on suspicion of assaulting a woman at hotel in Nagoya, Japan on 2 November.
