= Passion Yara =

Japanese comedian

Passion Yara (パッション屋良, Passhon Yara; born Chōbyō Yara (屋良 朝苗, Yara Chōbyō), July 23, 1976 in the city of Nago, Okinawa) is a Japanese comedian. He is perhaps best known for the angry, passionate chest-beating in his comedy routine.

Passion Yara graduated from Kokushikan University's physical education department with the intention of becoming an educator. He is well-built, at 86 kg and 180 cm, and is capable of bench-pressing 160 kg. He enjoys bowling, darts, muscle training, touring, MTV, and canoeing.

Yara has appeared on a variety of Japanese comedy-related TV shows and competitions in Japan, typically wearing a tight-fitting white gym outfit with an embroidered letter "P" on the collared shirt. His routine generally includes fits of maniacal, single-fisted chest-beating, for which he has gained some measure of notoriety. His act has been parodied by another Japanese comedian using the stage name "Dark Yara".

Passion Yara performed his chest-beating act and other dance moves on the J-ska band Yum!Yum!ORANGE's music video for the song "Clover".

Yara has also performed as a competitor on Sasuke (known in the United States as Ninja Warrior), having entered at least two competitions, the 16th and 21st. In the 16th competition, he entertained spectators with his chest-beating before succumbing to the Rolling Log obstacle early in Stage 1. Ninja Warrior later declared him to be the 5th craziest competitor in the history of the event, referring to him in an aired segment as "Screaming Wacko". In the 21st competition, he surpassed his previous performance by reaching the Jumping Spider in Stage 1, where he subsequently fell and was eliminated.
