= Makoto Nagano =

Japanese game show competitor

- Born: March 30, 1972 (age 54); Kitakata, Miyazaki, Japan
- Other name: World's Strongest Fisherman
- Occupations: Commercial fisherman Captain; Musician; Sasuke Competitor
- Spouse: Asami Nagano
- Children: 3

Makoto Nagano (長野 誠, Nagano Makoto; born March 30, 1972, in Kitakata, Miyazaki) (sometimes known as the World's Strongest Fisherman) is a Japanese commercial fisherman, captain, and musician. He is captain of his vessel F/V Konpira Maru 50 (第50金比羅丸), and was previously captain of the F/V Konpira Maru 28 (第28金比羅丸). He is regularly seen on the Japanese television show Sasuke (Ninja Warrior) where he was one of the "SASUKE All-Stars," a group of favored competitors who were thought to possess the greatest potential in completing the obstacle courses. He can also be seen on the lesser known spinoff to Ninja Warrior, Viking: The Ultimate Obstacle Course, where he was one of few competitors to make it to the final round.

Winning in the 17th Sasuke competition (2006) he is the second of only four victors of the competition. By the time he retired in July 2017, he had competed in 26 versions of Sasuke, and has since competed in a 27th version in 2020.

== Sasuke career ==
=== Training ===
Nagano spent 300 days a year training on his fishing ship for the Sasuke competitions.

=== Retirement ===
Leading up to the 32nd competition in 2016, Nagano formally announced his retirement from Sasuke, with his "last run" making up a significant portion of the broadcast and promotional material for the tournament. This involved several gifts from fans and fellow competitors alike, including a "finish" button normally found at the end of the courses. Additionally, a special retirement ceremony was held following his run, concluding with his friends and fellow competitors throwing him into a water pit, mirroring his total victory celebrations in Sasuke 17.

By the time he retired in July 2017, he had competed in 26 versions of Sasuke. As of 2020, he holds the record for reaching the final stage a total of five times.

After retirement, Nagano became a consultant and analyst for the program, appearing on the sidelines in every tournament since. In late 2020, it was announced that he was coming out of retirement to compete in the 38th tournament, his first Sasuke competition in four years.

=== Sasuke World Cup ===
In Sasuke World Cup 2024, He was selected to competed in Sasuke World Cup as Team Japan Legend as Captain team alongside Shingo Yamamoto, Katsumi Yamada (Sasuke All stars), Kane Kosugi, and one female in this team from Kunoichi or Women Ninja Warrior is Yuko Mizuno.

In Sasuke World Cup 2026, He was not competed this World cup competition, He was in Japan Legend Supporter along with Yuko Mizuno, Shingo Yamamoto, Katsumi Yamada and Yūji Urushihara. However, His son, Kaiou competed this World cup competition as Team Japan U20.

== U.S. appearance ==
In September 2008 Nagano made his first United States appearance at the Chibi-Pa Festival in West Palm Beach, Florida.

== Music career ==
Nagano released his first album, Yujou To Tatakaino Kiseki, in 2011.

== Personal life ==
Nagano has a wife named Asami Nagano, She was competed in Kunoichi's 8th Competition in First time.

Nagano has 3 children, Second Son named Taiou Nagano, Third son named Gen'ou Nagano, Including First son named Kaiou Nagano born in 2009 who competed in Sasuke's 40th Competition in First time.

== Sasuke appearances ==
This list shows all the competitions Nagano participated in, along with his contestant number, and the stage and obstacle where he was eliminated.

Competition	Start position	Obstacle	Stage
7th	87	Failed Warped Wall	First
8th	41	Failed Warped Wall	First
9th	61	Failed Pipe Slider	Third
10th	999*	Failed Jump Hang	First
11th	96	Failed Final Rope	Final
12th	100	Failed Final Rope (by 0.11 seconds)	Final
13th	100	Failed Final Rope	Final
14th	100	Failed Jumping Bars	Third
15th	100	Failed Metal Spin	Second
16th	100	Failed Devil's Swing	Third
17th	99	Total Victory (2.56 seconds to spare)	Final
18th	96	Disqualified on Shin-Cliff Hanger**	Third
19th	100	Failed Flying Chute	First
20th	2000*	Failed Downhill Jump	Second
21st	100	Failed Gliding Ring	Third
22nd	100	Failed Slider Jump	First
23rd	100	Failed G-Rope †	Final
24th	100	Failed Jumping Spider	First
25th	99	Failed Circle Slider	First
26th	99	Failed Jumping Spider	First
27th	100	Failed Ultimate Cliff Hanger	Third
28th	100	Failed Second Warped Wall	First
29th	100	Failed Second Warped Wall (injured)	First
30th	2999*	Failed Swap Salmon Ladder	Second
31st	98	Failed Warped Wall	First
32nd	100	Failed Lumberjack Climb (Time Out)	First
38th	98	Failed Dragon Glider	First
40th	3998*	Failed Second Warped Wall (Time Out)	First
41st	96	Failed Quad Steps	First
42nd	98	Failed Dragon Glider	First
43rd	98	Failed Dragon Glider	First

† - Nagano failed on the First Stage due to a malfunction on the Slider Jump. Since this was the fault of the course and not Nagano, he was given a second attempt at the First Stage, which would be the first time in Sasuke history that someone had been given a second chance after failing in the same competition. In his second attempt he would complete the First Stage and end up getting all the way to the Final Stage.

* In the 10th Competition, the contestant numbers ranged from 901 to 1000 to show that 1000 competitors have attempted Sasuke. Thus, rather than 99, Nagano's contestant number was 999. Similarly, in the 20th Competition, the numbers ran from 1901 to 2000 to indicate that 2000 competitors have attempted Sasuke's First Stage. Nagano's number was 2000 here rather than 100. Then, in the 30th Competition, the numbers went from 2901 to 3000 to indicate that 3000 competitors have attempted Sasuke's First Stage, and Nagano's number was 2999 rather than 99. In the 40th competition, the contestant numbers ranged from 3901 to 4000 to make clear that there had now been 4000 competitors that have attempted Sasuke's First stage. Nagano was therefore awarded the number 3998 to compete with instead of 98.
** When Nagano tried to cross the second gap in the redesigned Cliff Hanger, he accidentally grabbed the top frame with his left hand. Rather than continue on with the 3rd Stage, he announced his mistake, gracefully disqualifying himself from the competition. However, in unaired version, the producers asked Nagano to compete again the Third Stage, but Nagano declined it.

== See also ==
- Sasuke
- Kinniku Banzuke
