= Shōei =

- Born: Teruhide Takahashi; 4 April 1974 (age 52); Kōnosu, Saitama, Japan

Teruhide Takahashi (高橋 照英, Takahashi Teruhide; born 4 April 1974), better known by his stage name Shōei (照英, Shoei), is a Japanese actor.

== Career ==
Takahashi appeared in the weekly prime-time television series Mito Kōmon. The role he is best known for, however, is Gouki/GingaBlue in Seijuu Sentai Gingaman, and he reprised the role in two Super Sentai Series V-Cinema Films: Gogo V Vs Gingaman and Gaoranger Vs Super Sentai. He also competed on Sasuke during the early 2000s.

In his Pro Sportsman No.1 appearance, he particularly shone in the 8th Celebrity Survival Battle competition where, after clawing his way to the Shot-Gun-Touch event, he successfully completed 12m30cm by just a fingertip. This allowed him to edge his way into 1st Place and defeat prolific Celebrity Sportsman No.1 winner Kane Kosugi by a mere 1 point.

== Selected filmography ==
- Seijuu Sentai Gingaman (1998–1999)
- Seijuu Sentai Gingaman vs Megaranger (1999)
- Kyuukyuu Sentai GoGo-V vs Gingaman (2000)
- Tales of the Unusual (2000)
- Red Shadow (2001)
- Hyakujuu Sentai Gaoranger vs Super Sentai (2001)
- Yellow Dragon (2003)
- Fune o Oritara Kanojo no Shima aka Getting Off the Boat at Her Island (2003)
- School Wars: Hero (2004)
- Shinsengumi! (2004)
- Sakigake!! Otokojuku (2008)
- Mr. Osomatsu (2017, voice)
