= Paul Terek =

American Olympic decathlete (born 1979)

Paul Anthony Terek (born October 20, 1979, in Dearborn, Michigan) is an American Olympic decathlete. He graduated from Livonia Franklin High School in Livonia, Michigan. His personal best in decathlon is 8312 points, achieved in July 2004 in Sacramento at the United States Olympic Trials. Terek won the bronze medal and was placed on the United States Olympic Team. Out of the ten decathlon events, Terek is strongest in the pole vault, and he is comparatively weak in the 100 m and 400 m sprints.

Terek competed for the Michigan State Spartans track and field team, where he was a national runner-up in the indoor pole vault and decathlon in 2002.

Terek is also a two-time USA champion in the indoor heptathlon, 2003–4.

In September 2010, Terek became the co-host of Living the Run, a health and fitness radio that airs on ESPN 1280 on the Central Coast of California. Terek and his co-host, Ryan Foran, are health and fitness advocates who are entertaining their fans while interviewing guests and sharing health and fitness tips and news on the weekly radio show.

In 2006, Terek participated in the Japanese televised obstacle course Sasuke, currently syndicated in the United States as Ninja Warrior on the Esquire Network. Terek surpassed most of the other competitors but ultimately failed on the third stage obstacle, the Cliff Hanger, which requires traversal over a water pit with only small fingerholds to keep the competitor from falling into the water. Before the competition, his height and weight were recorded as 6 ft 3 in (1.91 m) and 210 lb (95 kg). He was by far the heaviest of all the contestants, weighing almost 60 pounds more than most of them (Makoto Nagano, who won the very same tournament, weighed only 62 kg (137 lb) at a height of 162 cm (5.31 ft)). It was said that Terek's weight was a factor in him falling from the Cliff Hanger early on. In the fall of 2007, Terek participated once again only to fail on the Jumping Spider obstacle in the first stage. He also helped oversee G4's second American Ninja Challenge prior to the 20th Sasuke competition (although Terek himself did not compete in that tournament). He did return to SASUKE in 2009 for the 22nd tournament, but failed the First Stage again, this time on an obstacle called the Slider Jump. The Slider Jump was again his downfall in the 24th tournament.

Prior to his SASUKE appearance in fall 2007, Terek competed in another Japanese televised show called "Pro Sportsman No.1" where he won the namesake's title.

In October 2010 he announced his retirement from international competition.

== Achievements ==
Year	Competition	Venue	Position	Notes
Representing the United States
2003	World Championships	Paris, France	12th	Decathlon
2004	Hypo-Meeting	Götzis, Austria	8th	Decathlon
2004	Olympic Games	Athens, Greece	21st	Decathlon
2005	World Championships	Helsinki, Finland	13th	Decathlon
2005	Décastar	Talence, France	12th	Decathlon
2006	Hypo-Meeting	Götzis, Austria	DNF	Decathlon
2007	World Championships	Osaka, Japan	10th	Decathlon

== SASUKE results ==
- 17th competition (86): Failed Cliff Hanger - Third Stage
- 19th competition (98): Failed Jumping Spider - First Stage
- 22nd competition (98): Failed Slider Jump - First Stage
- 24th competition (82): Failed Slider Jump - First Stage
