= Yuko Mizuno =

Japanese tarento and actor

- 水野 裕子
- Born: March 8, 1982 (age 44); Bisai, Aichi, Japan
- Other names: Yu-chan (裕ちゃん, Yū-chan)
- Education: Ichinomiya Municipal Bisai Second Junior High School; Aichi Prefectural Ichinomiya Commercial High School; Shubun University
- Occupations: Entertainer, actress, sportscaster
- Years active: 1998 -
- Agent: Sony Music Artists
- Height: 1.6 m (5 ft 3 in) (2013)

Yuko Mizuno (水野 裕子, Mizuno Yūko; born March 8, 1982 in Bisai, Aichi, Japan) is a Japanese entertainer, actress, and sportscaster represented by Sony Music Artists.

== Filmography ==
=== TV series ===
Year	Title	Network	Notes	Ref.
	Pīkan TV	THK	Monday regular	
1999	Akko ni Omakase!	TBS		
2000	King's Brunch	TBS		
	Sasuke	TBS		
	Kunoichi	TBS		
2003	Cyborg Tamashī	TBS		
2003	Baribari Value	TBS	Assistant	
2003	Kinniku Banzuke	TBS		
2003	Haretara ī ne! Let s Komimi-tai	Fuji TV		
2006	2006 Winter Olympics	TV Tokyo	Winter local caster	
2006	NFL Chūkei	NHK BS-1	Half-time information corner	
2006	Sunday Dragons	CBC	Occasional guest	
2006	Quiz! Hexagon II	Fuji TV	Quasi-regular	
2007	NBA Chūkei	NHK Sōgō, NHK BS-1	Navigator	
2008	Sport	Fuji TV	"Kayō Sport" caster	
2009	Easy Sports	TV Asahi		
	Q-sama	TV Asahi		
2010	Little Charo 2 Eigo ni Koisuru Monogatari	NHK E	Monthly guest	
2014	Shumi Do-raku	NHK E		
2015	The Premium	NHK BS Premium		

=== Radio series ===
Year	Title	Network	Notes
2002	The Ranking	FM Yokohama	
2003	Music Kingdom	FM Yokohama	

=== Video games ===
Year	Title	Notes
2007	The Sims 2: Pets	
