= Wataru Mori =

Japanese actor (born 1983)

- 森 渉
- Born: February 25, 1983 (age 43); Kanagawa Prefecture, Japan
- Occupation: Actor
- Years active: 2005 -
- Agent: Sun Music Production
- Height: 1.72 m (5 ft 8 in)
- Spouse: Tomoko Kaneda (m. 2013; div. 2024)
- Children: 1
- Website: Official profile

Wataru Mori (森 渉, Mori Wataru; born February 25, 1983, in Kanagawa Prefecture, Japan) is a Japanese actor who is represented by the talent agency, Sun Music Production.

Mori graduated from Komazawa University High School and Nippon Sport Science University. His former wife is voice actress Tomoko Kaneda.

== Filmography ==
Year	Title	Role	Network	Notes
2007	Yamada Tarō Monogatari	Chikara Nagaoka	TBS	
2007	Yūkan Club		NTV	Episode 1
2008	Shiro to Kuro		THK	Episodes 21, 22, and 25
2008	Room of King		Fuji TV	Episode 1
2008	Akai Ito		Fuji TV	Episode 1
2009	Shūkatsu no Musume	Ohara	TV Asahi	Final episode
2010	Zettai Reido		Fuji TV	Episode 2
2011	Hanawa-ke no Yonshimai		TBS	Final episode
2011	Sengoku Otoko-shi	Taneshige Mizutani	TVK	
2012	Kansatsu-i Hazuki Shinomiya Shitai wa Kataru		TV Tokyo	
2013	Tengoku no Koi		THK	Episode 16
2019	Sherlock: Untold Stories	Kaburagi	Fuji TV	Episode 4

=== Films ===
Year	Title	Role	Notes	Ref.
2005	Bōkoku no Ījisu			
2006	Rough			
2008	The Hidden Fortress			
2008	Shakariki!			
2010	Custard Pudding			
2013	Kyūkyoku!! Hentai Kamen			
2014	Oneness: Unmei Hikiyose no Kogane Ritsu	Yusuke Nakata		
