= Ichiro Furutachi =

Japanese announcer, tarento, and television presenter

- 古舘 伊知郎
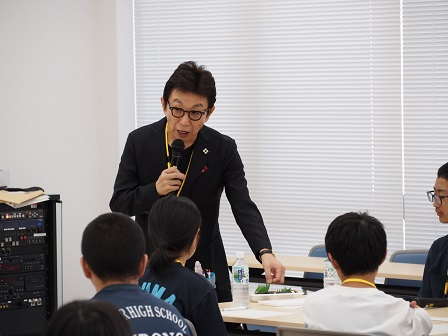
- Born: December 7, 1954 (age 71); Kita, Tokyo, Japan
- Other name: Itchan (いっちゃん)
- Education: Kita Kuritsu Takinogawa Dainishōgakkō; Chiyoda Kuritsu Kanda Hitotsubashi Chūgakkō; Rikkyo Niiza Junior and Senior High School; Rikkyo University
- Occupations: Announcer, tarento, television presenter, newscaster
- Years active: 1977–present
- Agent: Furutachi-Project
- Known for: Yoru no Hit Studio; Oshare Kankei; Quiz Akahaji Ao Haji; Kinniku Banzuke; Kōhaku Uta Gassen; Hōdō Station
- Relatives: Yutaro Furutachi (eldest son)

Ichiro Furutachi (古舘 伊知郎, Furutachi Ichirō; born December 7, 1954) is a Japanese announcer, tarento, television presenter, and newscaster represented by Furutachi-Project. He was an announcer for TV Asahi. He graduated from Kita Kuritsu Takinogawa Daini (No. 2) Elementary School, Chiyoda Kuritsu Kanda Hitotsubashi Junior High School, Rikkyo Niiza Junior and Senior High School, and Rikkyo University, where he studied Economics with a focus on Business Administration. Controversy erupted when he stepped down as the anchor of TV Asahi's evening news broadcast, Hōdō Station, a removal reportedly due to political pressure in response to the show's critical tone.

== Filmography ==
=== TV and radio series ===
==== Moderator, commentator ====
Year	Title	Network	Notes	Ref.
	World Pro Wrestling	TV Asahi		
1981	Ohayō TV Asahi	TV Asahi		
	Afternoon Show	TV Asahi	Reporter	
1982	Yume no Big Studio	TV Asahi		
1982	Bakushō!! Dot Studio	TV Asahi		
1982	13th Japan Music Awards	TV Asahi		
1983	Buttama! Pipu	TV Asahi		
1984	Sports Takarajima	TV Asahi		
1984	Waratte Iitomo!	Fuji TV		
1984	Waratte Iitomo Special Issue	Fuji TV		
1984	Akko Furutachi no Yū You Sunday	TBS		
1985	Akko Furutachi no a! Itchatta	TBS		
1987	Omedetō Hiromi Go Yurie Nitani Kekkon Hirō en	Fuji TV		
1987	FNS Music Festival	Fuji TV		
1988	Quiz Kore wa Omai!	TBS		
1988	Chikyū-hatsu 19-ji	TBS		
1988	Torendyi 9	TV Asahi		
1988	Auto Club	Fuji TV		
1989	Fuji TV F1 Chūkei	Fuji TV		
1989	F1 Pole Position	Fuji TV		
1989	Quiz! Yonimo Fushigina Gyaku Kaiten	Fuji TV		
1991	News Frontier	TV Asahi		
1991	Game Sūji de Q	NHK G TV		
1992	Good Japanese	TBS		
1992	MJ: Music Journal	Fuji TV	Presenter	
1993	Professional Baseball News	Fuji TV	Monday	
1993	Quiz Nihonjin no Shitsumon	NHK G TV		
1994	Kōhaku Uta Gassen	NHK		
1994	Quiz Akuma no Sasayaki	TBS		
1994	All-Star Thanksgiving	TBS		
1994	Oshare Kankei	NTV		
1995	Quiz Akahaji Ao Haji	TV Tokyo		
1995	Kinniku Banzuke	TBS		
1996	Kagayaku Nihon no Hoshi!	TBS		
1997	Happy Family Plan	TBS		
1997	Seimei 38 Oku-nen Special: Ningen to wa Nanida!?	TBS		
2000	OffReco!	TBS		
2001	FINA World Aquatics Championships	TV Asahi		
	Akko ni Omakase	TBS		
	Saidai Kōyaku Show	MBS, TBS		
	Sasuke	TBS		
	Pro Sportsman No.1	TBS		
	Dai 4 Gakku	Fuji TV		
	Oyashirazu Variety Tenshi no Kamen!!	ABC, TV Asahi		
	Sonnani Watashi ga Warui no ka!?	TV Asahi		
	Satappachi Furutachi no Nihonjōriku	TV Asahi		
	Satappachi Furutachi no Kaimono Bugi!	TV Asahi		
	Quiz Sekai wa Show by Shōbai!!	NTV		
	Beat Takeshi no TV Tackle	TV Asahi		
	Ichiro Furutachi no Akasaka Yarō 90-bu	TBS Radio		
	Fujiya Kayō Best Ten	NBS		
	FNS Super Special: 1 Oku-ri no TV Yumerettō	Fuji TV		
	Hatsumōde! Bakushō Hit Parade	Fuji TV		
2003	Test the Nation	TV Asahi		
2004	Hōdō Station	TV Asahi		
	Senkyo Station	TV Asahi		
2005	Test the Nation - IQ 2005	TV Asahi		

==== Dramas ====
Year	Title	Role	Network	Notes
1983	Abarenbō Shogun II	Police officer	TV Asahi	Episode 22
1984	Ijiwarubāsan		Fuji TV	
1985	Yoisho-kun		Fuji TV	Lead role
1987	Seisaku 2-bu Seishun Drama Han		TV Asahi	
1988	Koroshitai Onna		TBS	
1989	Gorilla: Keishichō Sōsa Dai 8 Han	Commentator	TV Asahi	Episode 1
1991	Kimi no Na wa	Sadahiko Honma	NHK	Asadora
2020	Yell	Torakichi Tsurukame	NHK	Asadora

=== Advertisements ===
Year	Title	Notes
1984	Isuzu Forward	
1985	Captain System	
1987	Meganesuper	
1994	Honda Primo Formula One	
	Keirin	
2017	Gran Turismo Sport	

=== Stage ===
Year	Title	Notes
1988	Talking Blues	
