= Hiroshi Sekiguchi =

Japanese actor

- 関口 宏
- Born: 13 July 1943 (age 82); Tokyo, Japan
- Citizenship: Japan
- Education: Rikkyo Niiza Junior and Senior High School; Rikkyo University
- Occupations: Actor; tarento; television presenter; newscaster; businessman
- Agent: Sankei
- Television: Tokyo Friend Park 2; Sunday Morning; Quiz 100-ri ni Kikimashita; Wakuwaku Dōbutsu Land; TV atto Random
- Spouse: Sachiko Nishida (m. 1971)
- Children: Tomohiro Sekiguchi (eldest son)
- Awards: Japan Lyricist Award; 23rd Hashida Prize Special Award

Hiroshi Sekiguchi (関口 宏, Sekiguchi Hiroshi; born 13 July 1943) is a Japanese actor, tarento, television presenter, newscaster, businessman and manager. He is a representative of the talent agency Sankei. He lives in Setagaya, Tokyo. He is the eldest of two brothers.

Sekiguchi's father is Shuji Sano, who was also an actor, and his brother is Mamoru Sano. His wife is singer Sachiko Nishida, and his son is actor and tarento Tomohiro Sekiguchi. Sekiguchi's grandfather is Kamijiro Sekiguchi (Konsan Sekiguchi) who was a steeplejack for the National Diet Building. His high school classmate was Ryuzo Hayashi, who was also an actor.

== Filmography ==
=== TV programmes ===
==== NHK ====
Year	Title	Notes
1970	Tokyo no Sanzoku	
1970	Stage 101	
1971	Gendai Kishi Michi	
1973	Nanikāru?	
1975	Genroku Taihei-ki	
1979	Takibi	
2008	Somosomo	Presenter
2013	Marugoto Shiritai! A to Z	Presenter

==== Nippon TV ====
Year	Title
1966	Aoi Sanmyaku
1968	Hana to Kajitsu
1968	Gochisōsama
1969	Maki-chan Nikki
1970	Odoroki Momo no Ki Sōdō-ki
1970	Nisshin Sekai Quiz
1971	Aru Teishu no Kokuhaku
1971	Mofuku no Hōmon-sha
1972	Endan Series: Hanayome no Chichi
1972	Ijippari Fūfu
1973	Hanamuko no Chichi
1973	Shinkon Yabai-den
1974	Kagami no Naka no Kao
1978	Bikkuri Nihon Shin Kiroku
1981	Gōka! Star Kazoku Taikō Hatsuharu Jumbo Quiz!
1981	Omoi Dasanaide!!
1982	Shōni Byōtō 305-gōshitsu Ōtō nashi!
1983	Anata wa Wagako o Mamoreru ka
1984	Seiko Gourmet World: Sekai Tabechauzo!!
1988	Kochira Yume Stadium
1989	Shitterutsumori?!
1992	Wonder Zone / Hiroshi Sekiguchi no bikkuri Talk: Hato ga demasu yo!
1995	Kagayake! Uwasa no Ten Best Show / Shin Ten Best Show / Dotch Cooking Show / Nippon Tabi×Tabi Show
1998	Japan Academy Prize
2009	Jōnetsu Hito-Kōjirō Matsukata: Matsukata Collection
2009	Anata no Myōji Show

==== Tokyo Broadcasting System ====
Year	Title	Notes
1965	Yorokobi mo kanashimi mo ikutoshitsuki	
1966	Young 720	
1969	Ohiru ni aimashou	Co-presented with Keizo Kawasaki
1969	Konnichiwa! Soyokaze-san	
1969	24-Sai	
1969	Omusubi Kororin	
1972	Haitte mā su!	
1973	Rikon Ryokō	
1976	Sachiko no Koi	
1976	Hontō ni	
1977	Quiz Sekai o anata ni	
1978	Nichiyō Toku Van	
1979	Edo o Kiru	
1979	Quiz 100-ri ni Kikimashita	
1979	Nonomura Byōin Monogatari	
1981	San Nan Sanjo Mukoippiki	
1982	Aruhitotsuzen Koidatta	
1982	Nonomura Byōin Monogatari II	
1983	Wakuwaku Dōbutsu Land	
1985	Uchi no Ko ni Kagitte...	Episode 2
1987	Quiz marugoto dai shūgō	
1987	Kagayaku! Japan Record Award	
1987–2024	Sunday Morning	
1989	Hiroshi Sekiguchi no yokubari Calendar	
1991	Yuzo Kayama 30-Shūnen Kikaku: Aniki ni Kanpai	
1991	Morishige Hisaya Bunka Kunshō Jushō kinen Sakuhin: Oyaji no Hige 11	
1992	Tokyo Friend Park	
1993	Hiroshi Sekiguchi no Para Paradise	
1994–2011	Tokyo Friend Park 2	
1996	National Gekijō 40 Shūnenkinen Special: Mito Kōmon	
1996	Megami no Tenbin	
1997	Inochi no Hibiki	Guest appearance
1998	Habatake! Penguin	
1998	Hiroshi Sekiguchi no Hōdō 30-jikan TV	
2003	Hiroshi Sekiguchi no "Rekishi wa Kurikaesu"	
2004	8-Jidesu! Minna no Monday	
2006	Hiroshi Sekiguchi no Nippon o Sagashi ni ikou!	
2008	Hiroshi Sekiguchi no Nippon o Sagashi ni ikou! 2	
2008	Suiyō Nonfiction	
2009	Tōshōdaiji 1200-nen no Nazo: Tenpyō o kake nuketa Otome-tachi	
2010	Hiroshi Sekiguchi no The Best Selection	
2011	Seiki no Wide Show! The Konya wa History	
2011	Hiroshi Sekiguchi no Shōwa Seishun Grafiti	
2012	Hiroshi Sekiguchi no Kaze ni Fukarete	
2014	Hiroshi Sekiguchi no Jinsei no Uta	
2016	Hiroshi Sekiguchi Nippon Fudoki	

==== Fuji Television ====
Year	Title	Notes
1967	Seishun	
1969	Otoko janai ka	Lead role
1971	Star Sen Ichiya	
1972	Utau Star Couple: Konya no Koibito	
1973	Ōkubo Hikozaemon	
1976	Yudan!	
1977	Shin Kawaramachi Higashi Agaru	Lead role
1977	FNS Music Festival	
1979	Shinkon Plus One	
1981	Shimizu Nojirochō	
1982	Egao Nakigao Fukure-gao	
1983	Machiko Hasegawa no Ijiwaru Cookie	
1990	Chottomatta!!	
1994	'94 Yoru no Hit Studio: Chō X'mas Deluxe	

==== TV Asahi ====
Year	Title	Notes	Ref.
1963	Ojōsan Kanpai!		
1963	Futaridake no Hashi		
1964	Ai wa Umi yorimo Fukaku		
1966	Kazanrettō		
1968	Nagareru Kumo		
1968	Yūyake Sora		
1970	Dan Ai		
1976	Hiroshi Sekiguchi no Ō! Emiuta		
1979	Zennihon Kayō Ongaku-sai		
1980	The Conpinion / Hello! Conpinion		
1980	Unmei no Tabiji: Nazo no Tokkyū Izumo 1-gō		
1980	Chin Shunshin no Kamikemono no Tsume		
1981	Kayō Dokkiri Dai Hōsō!!		
	Shinkon-san Irasshai	As Katsura Saegusa (currently Katsura Bunshi VI); co-starring with Nagisa Katahira	
1982	Montage Shashin no Nazo		
1982	Akachan Torichigae Jiken		
1983	Koroshi no Rensa Hannō	Lead role	
1983	Mado no Naka no Satsujin		
1986	Music Station	Original presenter before Tamori took his place	
1989	Dōsuru?! TV Tackle	Later changed into Beat Takeshi no TV Tackle	
2000	Honpara! Sekiguchi Dō Shoten		
2001	Honpara! Tsūkai Seminar		

==== TV Tokyo ====
Year	Title	Notes
1978	Ryū no iru Umi	
1979	Yukutoshi Kurutoshi	
1981	Sekai omoshiro Network	
1984	TV atto Random	
2004	The Shinsō: Daijigen Kenshō Special	Revived era
2005	Hiroshi Sekiguchi no "Dai Teinen Jidai"	One-off
2006	Hiroshi Sekiguchi no "Jinkō Genshō Jidai"	One-off

=== Radio programmes ===
Year	Title	Network
1968	Hoshizora no Futari	TBS Radio
1971	Anata to Hiroshi to Ongaku to	TBS Radio

== Stage ==
Year	Title
1976	Haha no Suzu

== Films ==
Year	Title
1965	Yottsu no Koi no Monogatari
1966	Hakuchō
1967	Koi no Highway
1969	Shachō enma Jō
1969	Zoku Shachō enma Jō
1970	Shachō-gaku ABC
1970	Zoku Shachō-gaku ABC
1971	Kankonsōsai Nyūmon: Shinkon Kokoroe no Maki
1973	Sakura no Daimon
1977	Kiri no Hata
1984	Keiji Monogatari 3: Shiosai no Uta
1985	Keiji Monogatari 4: Kuroshio no Uta

== Advertisements ==
Year	Title	Co-stars
1970	Lotte Ghana Black Chocolate	
	Asahi Kasei	Sachiko Nishida and Tomohiro Sekiguchi
	Government public relations	
	Tokyo Gas	
	Lion Corporation Smile, Indenter Systema	
	Corona	
	Koa Kasai	
	Nissan Sunny and Stanza	
1973	House Java Curry	Shuji Sano and Nishida
	Hana no Nakama	

== Lyrics ==
Year	Artist	Song	Composer
1977	Rumiko Koyanagi	"Hoshi no Suna"	Hide Demon
1977	Rumiko Koyanagi	"Mizūmi no Inori"	Hide Demon

== Bibliography ==
Year	Title
1984	Ningen kore de ī no ka na
2003	Aloha Again
2012	TV Ya Dokuhaku
