= Rikkyo High School =

Rikkyo High School may refer to:

- Rikkyo School (Ikebukuro) (St. Paul's School), a school in Ikebukuro, Toshima, Tokyo, Japan, based on Christian values
- Rikkyo Niiza Junior and Senior High School
- Rikkyo School in England, a Japanese boarding secondary school in Rudgwick, England
