= Tokyo Friend Park 2 =

Japanese game show, 1994–2011

- Japanese: 東京フレンドパークII
- Genre: game show
- Starring: Hiroshi Sekiguchi; Masayuki Watanabe; Honjamaka (Ishizuka and Megumi)
- Country of origin: Japan
- Original language: Japanese

Production
- Production locations: TBS Studios, Tokyo
- Production company: TBS

Original release
- Network: JNN (TBS)
- Release: 11 April 1994 – 28 March 2011

Related
- Tokyo Friend Park

Tokyo Friend Park 2 (Japanese: 東京フレンドパークII; often abbreviated as "TFP2") is a Japanese game show that premiered in April 1994 on the Tokyo Broadcasting Station (TBS). TFP2 airs on Monday nights roughly from 6:55 - 7:54 JST in Japan.

== Format ==
A preset number of contestants (typically four) compete for prizes that range from foot baths, massage chairs and big screen televisions to new vehicles (typically a Land Rover). As with most Japanese game shows, the contestants are usually already celebrities in Japan such as singers, comedians, models (idols), actors, etc.

The contestants are organized in one team and compete in several games throughout the show. For each mini game they clear, the team is awarded a gold coin that can be used to win prizes at the end. Any team that successfully clears all of the games wins the Grand Slam Prize, usually a trip to Disneyland.

== Games ==
The mini game format is very similar to that of The Price Is Right. Each show features a few mini games that are selected on a seemingly rotational basis from a library of games. However, there are a few games that occur each week. In every show, the team is awarded coins based on how well they do in each mini game and if they clear all of the games, the team will earn a "Grand Slam" and a trip to Disneyland in Paris or Anaheim for one week. At the end, teams will be given a set of darts (one dart for each coin they've won) that they can throw at a spinning dart board to try to win prizes. The spinning board is cut into a pie fashion similar to the Showcase Showdown wheel on The Price Is Right.

Mini games have preset benchmarks that teams must meet in order to win coins. Teams that do exceptionally well can be awarded extra coins.

=== Mini games ===
Examples of mini games included on the show include:

- Wall Crash: This is a game in which contestants will dress in a velcro suit and run towards a mini-trampoline, which will launch them towards a velcro wall. The objective of the contestant is to jump as high as they can to gain the highest position on the wall as possible. Famous Japanese pop group Morning Musume competed in 2000.
- Quiz! Body and Brain: This game takes two players. The first runs on a treadmill and the other is asked a number of trivia questions. If the team can successfully complete the quota of questions, they win a coin.
- Fool on the Hill: The first participant listens to a section of the melody of a song on the headphones, and then must match the melody using music pads by hitting on the right "note" pads at the right time. The second player is then asked to identify the song based on the notes that the first player managed to hit at the right time.
- Flash Saurus: One player pumps air into a vertical tube using what resembles a bicycle tire pump, while the other player stands on an approximately one-meter ledge. When the object inside the tube reaches the top, the player standing on the ledge must then jump off the ledge and land on the ground below precisely when the track lights reach the platform.
- Never Wipe Out: In this game, two players stand on a long platform that sways from side to side like a teeter-totter. In front of them is an attached giant platformed board that moves with the teeter-totter. A ball is dropped from the top and the players must use the teeter-totter and gravity to navigate the ball all the way to a basket at the bottom of the maze. To make the challenge more difficult, a motorized platform moves the basket back and forth at the bottom.
- Hyper Hockey: This is usually the last competitive game in the show. Two members of the team play air hockey against the comedy duo Honjamaka. As the comedy duo plays air hockey every week, they are given a handicap of a ridiculous costume that hinders their ability to play. The game is played to 7 points, and if the contestant team wins they gain an extra coin and a "Grand Slam" for clearing all of the other games.

=== Darts ===
At the end of each show, participants can choose between taking the coins (worth ¥100,000 each) or trading their coins in for darts; most contestants trade their coins for a dart each. Participants will then throw their darts at a large spinning dart-board. A very small section stands for a new car for each participant while the other sections size are equally and each represent a prize that was chosen by the participants. If the dart hits the board the contestant will win the prize shown. Prizes range from a variety of electronics to a Land Rover. If the contestant's dart lands in a gray area, they win a tawashi (a sponge, the show's joke prize).

== Guests ==
Guest List
#	Air date	Guest	Games
	1995.10.02	SMAP	
	1996	V6	
	1997	TOKIO	
	2000	Morning Musume	
	2001	Morning Musume	
	2003.01.02	SMAP	
	2003.10.06	TOKIO	
	2005.09.26	V6	
	2006.10.23	Junichi Okada; Sho Sakurai; and others; (from Kisarazu Cat's Eye)	Wall Crash
	2006.12.25	Mao Inoue; Jun Matsumoto; Shun Oguri; Shota Matsuda; Tsuyoshi Abe; (from Hana Yori Dango 2)	Wall Crash
	2007.10.08	Tomoya Nagase; Tadayoshi Okura; (from Utahime)	Wall Crash
	2008.03.03	Tomohisa Yamashita; Show Aikawa; (from Kurosagi The Movie)	Wall Crash
	2008.03.31	Arashi	Wall Crash, Physical Mail, Fool on the Hill, Arcade 6, Stopper Cubridge, Quiz! Body and Brain, Hyper Hockey
	2008.06.30	Satoshi Ohno; Toma Ikuta; (from Maō)	Wall Crash, Never Wipe Out!
	2008.07.21	Ryuta Sato; Eri Murakawa; Takeru Sato; Yosuke Kawamura; Kenta Kiritani; (from ROOKIES)	
	2008.10.06	Kazunari Ninomiya; Ryo Nishikido; Erika Toda; Jun Kaname; (from Ryusei no Kizuna)	Wall Crash
	2009.07.23	Hideaki Takizawa; Ryo Nishikido; Asami Mizukawa; (from Orthros no Inu)	Wall Crash
	2009.09.17	Morning Musume; Yuko Nakazawa; Mari Yaguchi; Hitomi Yoshizawa; Nozomi Tsuji	
	2010.02.11	Kazuya Kamenashi; Yuya Tegoshi; Hiroki Uchi; Shuntaro Miyao; Aya Oomasa; Seishiro Kato; (from Yamato Nadeshiko Shichi Henge)	Wall Crash
	2010.09.20	Hideaki Takizawa & Johnny's Jr.	Go! Uphill, Panic Ringoskii 2, Wild Wild Duck, Hyper Hockey
	2010.11.22	Tackey & Tsubasa	Wall Crash, Never Wipe Out!, Deli Soba Gold, Quiz! Body and Brain, Hyper Hockey
	2010.11.29	Kara (band)	
	2010	Supernova (band)	
