= Tomoko Honda =

Japanese announcer

Tomoko Honda (本田朋子, Honda Tomoko, 16 August 1983 in Matsuyama, Ehime) is an announcer associated with the Phonics entertainment agency, and who formerly was an announcer on Fuji Television. Honda attended Rikkyo University, where she was selected to be "Miss Rikyo" in 2002, resulting in her being recruited by the Cent. Force talent agency. She graduated in 2006, and has been working for Fuji TV since April of that year. In 2013, she moved from Fuji TV to Phonics to become a freelance announcer.

Honda used to date Makoto Hasebe, but the relationship ended by 2010. She married basketball player Kei Igarashi in 2013, and later announced her first pregnancy in 2018.
