= Tokyo Broadcasting System Television =

Television station in the Kantō region of Japan

JORX-DTV
- Logo used since 2020

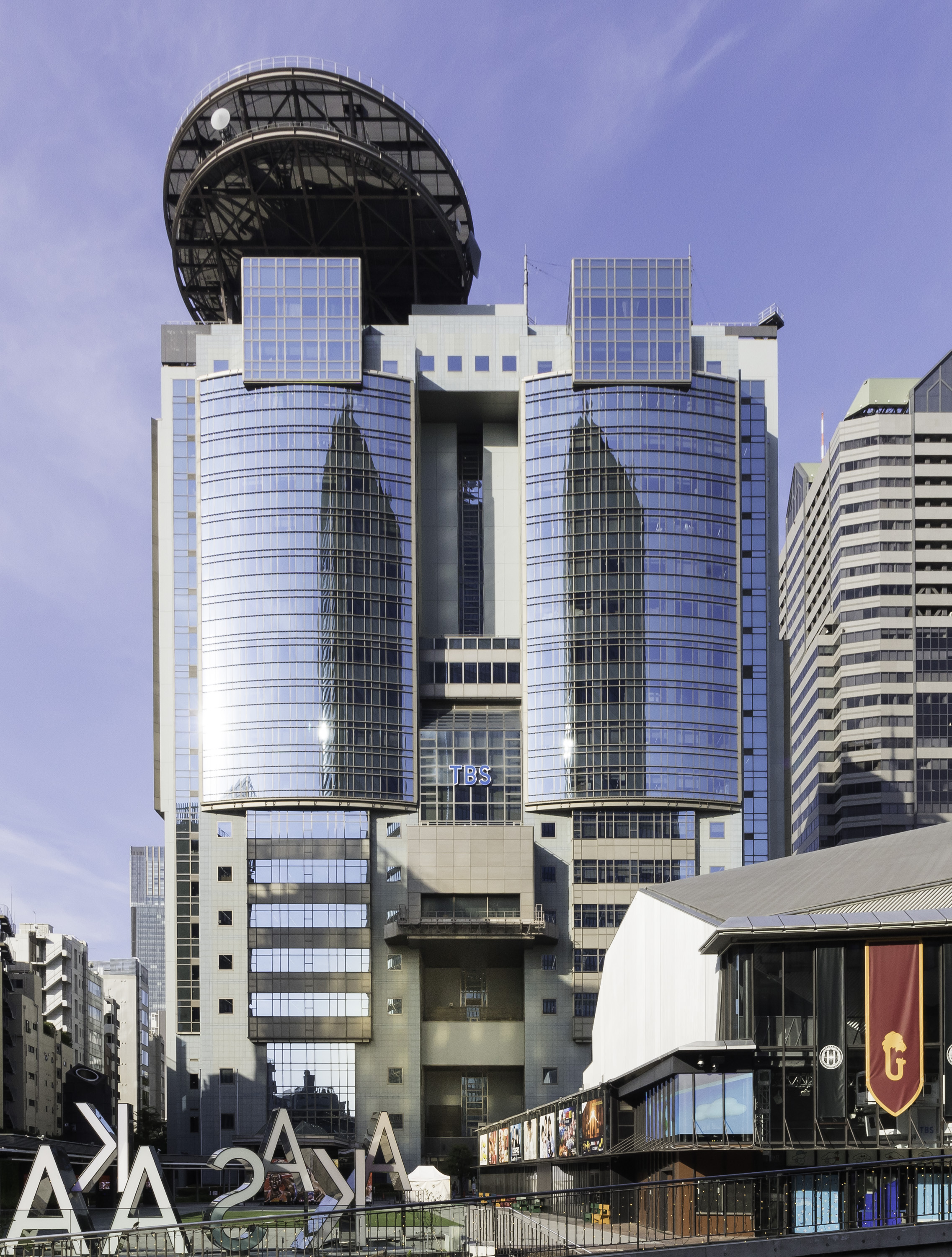
- Headquarters in Minato, Tokyo
- Kantō region; Japan
- City: Tokyo
- Channels: Digital: 22 (UHF); Virtual: 6
- Branding: TBS Television; TBS

Programming
- Language: Japanese
- Affiliations: Japan News Network

Ownership
- Owner: Tokyo Broadcasting System Television, Inc.
- Sister stations: BS-TBS; TBS Channel 1; TBS Channel 2; TBS News

History
- First air date: April 1, 1955
- Former call signs: JOKR-TV (1955-2001); JORX-TV (2001-2011)
- Former names: Radio Tokyo Television (1955–1960); Tokyo Broadcasting System (1960–2009) (Note: Despite the name being retired by 2009, it is currently in use for international operations.)
- Former channel numbers: Analog: 6 (VHF, 1955-2011)
- Call sign meaning: R from former corporate name Radio Tokyo

Technical information
- Licensing authority: MIC
- ERP: 68 kW
- Transmitter coordinates: 35°39′31″N 139°44′44″E

Links
- Website: https://www.tbs.co.jp

Corporate information
- Company
- Native name: 株式会社TBSテレビ
- Romanized name: Kabushiki gaisha TBS terebi
- Formerly: TBS Entertainment, Inc. (2000-2004)
- Type: Subsidiary KK
- Industry: Media
- Predecessors: TBS Live; TBS Sports
- Founded: March 21, 2000
- Headquarters: TBS Broadcasting Center, Akasaka, Minato, Tokyo, Japan
- Services: Television broadcasting; Television program production and distribution
- Parent: TBS Holdings
- Footnotes; Data from its Corporate Profile

JORX-DTV (channel 6), branded as TBS Television (TBSテレビ, TBS Terebi), is the flagship station of the Japan News Network in the Kantō region. It is owned-and-operated by Tokyo Broadcasting System Television, Inc. (Note: Japanese: 株式会社TBSテレビ, Hepburn: Kabushiki gaisha TBS Terebi), a subsidiary of the TBS Holdings. TBS Television is one of the "five private broadcasters based in Tokyo."

TBS produced the game show Takeshi's Castle, which is dubbed and rebroadcast internationally. The channel was also home to Ultraman and the Ultra Series franchise starting in 1966—initially a spinoff of Ultra Q, which was co-produced and broadcast in the same year. Most, if not all, of these series were produced by Tsuburaya Productions for the network. In the 2010s, the Ultra Series moved to TV Tokyo. Since the 1990s, TBS has been the home of Sasuke (Ninja Warrior), whose format inspired similar programs outside Japan. Sasuke itself was a spinoff of the TBS game show Kinniku Banzuke, which ran for seven seasons.

On May 24, 2017, TBS and five other major media firms—TV Tokyo, Nikkei, Inc., WOWOW, Dentsu, and Hakuhodo DY Media Partners announced that they would jointly establish a new company, Paravi, in July to offer paid online video services. TBS Holdings became the largest shareholder of the new company, Premium Platform Japan, with a 31.5% stake. Yasuhiro Takatsuna, an official from TBS Holdings, was appointed as the new company's president.

== Overview ==
Its predecessor, Radio Tokyo, Inc., was established in 1951 as a general broadcaster. On April 1, 1955, it launched as the second privately owned TV station in Japan, following Nippon Television, and simultaneously became the only TV and radio station in Tokyo (spun off in 2001). At that time, Radio Tokyo incorporated local stations into the Japan News Network (JNN) by promoting the elimination of newspaper influence in forming the news network, thereby establishing a powerful reporting system.

The current TBS Television was originally established as TBS Entertainment, Inc. a production company that produced entertainment programs for Tokyo Broadcasting System (the trade name of Radio Tokyo Co., Ltd. at the time). Since the broadcasting license was owned by the parent company, TBS, TBS Entertainment was not a member of the Japan Commercial Broadcasters Association.

On April 1, 2009, Tokyo Broadcasting System (which changed its trade name to Tokyo Broadcasting System Holdings, Inc. on the same day) underwent a corporate split. The television broadcasting business, including the television broadcasting license and the operation of various facilities such as Akasaka Sacas and Akasaka BLITZ, along with cultural projects such as events, was inherited by the newly established company, which retained the abbreviation TBS. This company transitioned from being a production company to a general broadcaster (currently a private terrestrial core broadcaster) and joined the Japan Commercial Broadcasters Association. Additionally, TBS Radio was entrusted with the maintenance and management of the company's transmitting station in Toda City, Saitama Prefecture.

== History ==
=== Early history ===
Matsutarō Shōriki, the former owner of Yomiuri Shimbun, first proposed the idea of private broadcasting in Japan in 1951. In June of the following year, NHK, Yomiuri Shimbun, and Radio Tokyo (the first private radio broadcaster) were among the first to apply for a TV broadcast license. In July of the same year, the Radio Supervision Committee announced the granting of a preliminary license to Nippon Television, while holding off on the applications of NHK (because the National Assembly needed to pass NHK's business plan) and Radio Tokyo (due to its recent establishment). On January 16 of the following year, Radio Tokyo obtained a TV preparatory license. After the completion of its TV headquarters, Radio Tokyo was granted an official TV broadcasting license on January 28, 1955.

At 10 am on April 1, 1955, Radio Tokyo TV (shortened to KRT) began broadcasting. According to a KRT survey conducted from November to December 1955, KRT's average audience rating from 6:00 pm to 9:30 pm was 24.4%, slightly ahead of Nippon TV's 24.1% and NHK's 21.9%. The income of Radio Tokyo's television division increased after broadcasting began, surpassing that of the radio division in 1957. In the early days of broadcasting, American TV series such as Adventures of Superman and Lassie played a role in KRT's program schedule. 77 Sunset Strip, which began airing in 1960, also sparked a ratings boom. In terms of technology, in July 1955, KRT and Toshiba jointly developed Japan's first domestic TV studio camera. The following year, KRT and Hokkaido Broadcasting jointly participated in the Japanese product exhibition held in Beijing, where they conducted a TV broadcast test in China for the first time.

=== Forming a network; transition from KRT to TBS ===
Logo used from 1960 to 1961

Logo used from 1961 to 1991

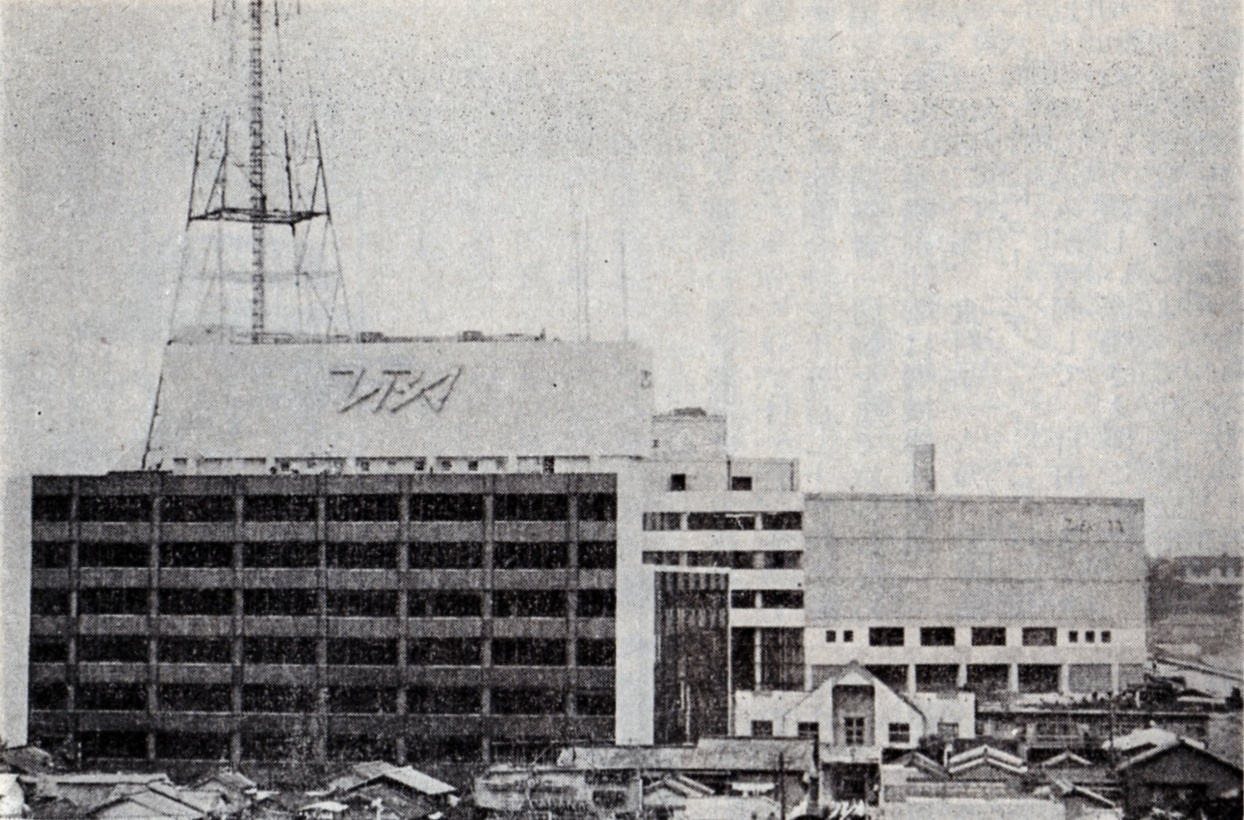
TBS headquarters in 1961

At the beginning of 1959, the third and fourth flagship stations in the Tokyo area, Nippon Educational Television (now TV Asahi) and Fuji TV, began broadcasting—NET on February 1 and Fuji TV on March 1. Around the same time, a large number of people purchased TV sets to watch the wedding of Crown Prince Akihito and Michiko Shoda. By April 3, 1959, the number of TV households in Japan had reached 2 million. Japan's TV advertising costs also increased from 400 million yen in 1954 to 23.8 billion yen in 1959. On April 10, 1959, KRT broadcast all of the wedding of Crown Prince (now Emperor Emeritus) Akihito and Empress Michiko, with 17 TV stations simulcasting the KRT broadcast.

In June 1958, KRT signed a news material exchange agreement with CBC, OTV, RKB, and HBC. This agreement lead to KRT's idea of establishing a national network. Building on the cooperation among various stations during the Crown Prince's wedding, KRT signed a JNN news agreement with 15 TV stations from across Japan on August 1, 1959, creating Japan's first TV network, the Japan News Network (JNN). By the end of that year, the number of JNN-affiliated stations had increased to 18.

The JNN news agreement stipulated that each station would be responsible for news gathering in its own region and was obligated to provide the news materials it collected to JNN. It also prohibited exchanging news materials with other networks or broadcasting news programs and other content from other networks. The following year, KRT, CBC, ABC, RKB, and HBC established the "Five Station Alliance" to strengthen cooperation in various fields.

In October 1960, KRT was listed on the Tokyo Stock Exchange. To reflect the reality that television had replaced radio broadcasting as the company's main business, Radio Tokyo changed its name to Tokyo Broadcasting System on November 28, 1960, and the English abbreviation changed from KRT to TBS.

KRT began trial broadcasting of color TV on February 2, 1959. On September 10 of the following year, KRT officially launched color TV broadcasts, becoming one of the first eight TV channels in Japan to do so. At that time, TBS believed that color TV technology was not yet fully developed, and as a result, it was less active in colorizing its programs compared to other Japanese TV stations. In October 1970, TBS completed its transition to color broadcasting, with its first primetime broadcasts using NTSC-J color for non-news programming.

=== Hero of private TV ===
In October 1961, in response to the rising challenge from Fuji TV, which was seeing increasing ratings, TBS undertook a major reorganization of its program schedule. American TV dramas and music programs for young audiences were scheduled for 7:00 pm, American TV series at 8:00 pm, and TBS's self-produced TV series at 9:00 pm This new arrangement boosted TBS's ratings and prompted other stations to adopt similar schedules, making the one-hour program format a standard in the Japanese TV industry.

In the early 1960s, Ben Casey was the most successful TV series broadcast by TBS from the United States, achieving a rating of 50.6%, which remains the highest rating for a foreign TV series broadcast in Japan. However, as TBS's capability to produce its own programs improved, the network gradually reduced its broadcast of American TV series after the mid-1960s.

On November 1, 1963, TBS eliminated the afternoon break from Monday to Thursday to provide uninterrupted broadcasting throughout the day. According to a 1963 survey by Video Research, TBS had an average audience rating of 16.7% during prime time, ranking first among all Tokyo stations. Its average full-day audience rating was 8.3%, lower than NHK's but the highest among private stations.

On November 23, 1963, TBS, along with Nippon TV and NHK, conducted the first satellite broadcast between Japan and the United States, covering the assassination of John F. Kennedy.

In the early 1960s, spurred by the 1964 Summer Olympics, TBS experienced rapid growth. By 1965, TBS reported a turnover of 14.702 billion yen and a profit of 1.673 billion yen. To diversify income beyond advertising, TBS funded the establishment of the Tokyo Electronics Research Institute (now Tokyo Power Technology) in 1963.

From 1961 to 1964, TBS constructed TBS Hall on the north side of its headquarters and began exploring the real estate business. In the late 1960s, TBS also established TBS Encyclopædia Britannica and TBS School of Computer Science, expanding into cultural and educational industries.

In the early 1970s, TBS opened housing exhibition halls in Musashisakai, Omiya, Machida, Hachioji, and other locations, entering the housing industry. TBS's investment in radio and television-related businesses increased from 2.1 billion yen in 1968 to 11.5 billion yen in 1973.

However, following the first oil crisis in 1973, many of TBS's sideline investments encountered operational difficulties. Consequently, TBS focused its resources on broadcasting and television, selling shares in subsidiaries such as TBS Encyclopædia Britannica.

Although TBS's profits declined for two consecutive years in 1974 and 1975 due to the Japanese economic downturn, turnover and profit began to rise again after 1976. By 1977, the turnover of TBS's TV department had exceeded 65.5 billion yen.

On the other hand, due to high labor costs and the high ratings of outsourced TV series, TBS began promoting program outsourcing in the 1970s to reduce costs. As part of this strategy, TBS transferred some employees to a newly established program production subsidiary.

In 1973, the turnover of the TBS TV department exceeded 40 billion yen. During the mid-1970s, major national newspapers in Japan reorganized their equity holdings in TV stations. The Asahi Shimbun and Yomiuri Shimbun sold their stakes in TBS to the Mainichi Shimbun. By April 1974, the Mainichi Shimbun held a total of 9.97% of TBS shares, becoming the only newspaper shareholder among TBS's major shareholders.

However, in 1977, the Mainichi Shimbun sold most of its TBS shares due to a financial crisis, causing TBS to become less popular among the core newspaper bureaus, after MBS affiliation was transferred from ANN to JNN in 1975.

In 1979, TBS introduced the promotional slogan "TBS for the BEST," marking its peak performance and ratings at the turn of the 1970s and 1980s. During audience rating surveys in the spring and autumn of 1978, all 24 JNN-affiliated stations achieved top rankings in both prime-time and full-day audience ratings. From 1977 to 1980, TBS held first place in turnover among all flagship stations for four consecutive years. In 1980, the turnover of the TBS TV department exceeded 95 billion yen.

TBS also made technological innovations, beginning in 1976 with the gradual introduction of the Electronic News Gathering (ENG) system, which enhanced news interviewing and editing capabilities. In November 1978, TBS began broadcasting stereo programs.

=== 1980s and 1990s: "Triple Crown ratings" ===
Logo used from 1994–2020

In 1982, Fuji Television surpassed TBS and claimed the number one position in prime-time ratings among all core stations. Although TBS maintained the top spot in turnover among core bureaus after 1980, its profit declined for four consecutive years starting in 1980.

In response to the challenge from Fuji TV, TBS introduced new programs targeting younger audiences but failed to achieve the desired results. In October 1984, TBS undertook a reorganization of its program schedule, delaying the end time of the evening news program JNN NewScope from 7:00 pm to 7:20 pm, which helped TBS regain the top spot in prime-time ratings from October 1984 through March 1985.

Despite this, the turnover of TBS's television department was surpassed by Nippon Television and Fuji Television in 1984. By 1985, Fuji TV had also surpassed TBS in overall turnover. Meanwhile, in response to the trend towards multi-channel broadcasting, TBS actively pursued new ventures. In 1984, TBS participated in establishing Japan Satellite Broadcasting (now Wowow and U-Next) and began broadcasting TV information in 1986.

Compared to Fuji TV, which focuses on younger audiences, TBS targets family audiences and offers greater program diversity. However, from April to September 1987, TBS's prime-time ratings were surpassed by other Japanese TV stations, dropping to third place among flagship stations.

To counter TV Asahi's high ratings for News Station at 10:00 pm on weekdays, TBS launched JNN News 22 Prime Time in 1987 to directly compete with it. The program schedule of TBS was significantly adjusted due to this new addition. However, JNN News 22 Prime Time only aired for a year due to low ratings. Its successor, JNN News Desk '88・'89, also failed to disrupt News Station's dominance during this period.

After April 1988, TBS's prime-time ratings began to decline, with the decline accelerating after April 1989. Despite this downturn, which coincided with Japan's bubble economy, TBS's financial performance continued to improve. In 1987 and 1988, TBS's turnover grew by 12% for two consecutive years. In 1989, TBS's profit exceeded 11.7 billion yen, and the TV department's turnover surpassed 168.8 billion yen. Taking advantage of the favorable financing conditions during the bubble economy, TBS decided to build a new headquarters in the late 1980s.

On the 40th anniversary of its launch, TBS signed a cooperation agreement with Glavkosmos, the foreign trade and aviation authority of the Soviet Union, in March 1989. The agreement aimed to send a TBS employee into space, making them Japan's first astronaut. This initiative was known as the TBS Universe Project.

A total of 163 employees from the TBS Group applied for selection. After physical examinations, written tests, and evaluations by the Soviet Union, Toyohiro Akiyama and Ryoko Kikuchi emerged as the final candidates. In October 1989, Akiyama and Kikuchi traveled to the astronaut training center near Moscow for their training. After 13 months of training, the Soviet Union announced in November 1990 that Akiyama would be Japan's first astronaut, with Kikuchi as an alternate.

On December 2, 1990, Toyohiro Akiyama flew to the Mir space station aboard the Soyuz spacecraft, becoming the first Japanese person and the first reporter to enter space. TBS aired a special program every night from December 1 to 10, providing comprehensive live coverage of Akiyama's space journey. On December 10, Akiyama returned to Earth safely.

In October 1989, TBS made major adjustments to its program schedule, achieving a prime-time adaptation rate of 40.4% and an evening-time adaptation rate of 51.8%, which brought the prime-time ratings back to 15.1%. However, after April 1990, due to a decline in TV drama ratings, TBS's prime-time ratings fell again and were surpassed by other Japanese TV stations. From October 1991 to March 1992, TBS's prime-time ratings dropped to 12.2%.

Facing a downturn in ratings due to the final years of the Cold War, TBS President Kazumi Tanaka invited McKinsey & Company in 1990 to conduct a comprehensive corporate identity redesign. The following year, Dentsu was selected through bidding to refresh TBS's corporate image and launched the "Microcosmos" logo. TBS also set a goal of achieving a group turnover of 500 billion yen by 2000 and aimed to increase the turnover from non-TV segments to 40% of the group's total turnover. As a result, TBS regained the top spot in ratings in 1993.

However, the overly radical reforms led to dissatisfaction within TBS. Additionally, the decrease in advertising revenue following the collapse of the bubble economy caused TBS's turnover and profit to decline in 1991. It was also revealed that TBS had received compensation for investment losses from Nomura Securities. These issues led to the resignation of Tanaka and Izumi in October 1991, and many of the corporate identity reform measures were abolished the following year.

The aftermath of the bubble economy further worsened TBS's operating conditions. By 1992, TBS's profit had fallen to only 1.7 billion yen, and the ratings continued to decline as the company faced challenges.

From April to September 1992, TBS's prime-time ratings were only 11.7%, dropping to fifth place in Tokyo. In October 1992, TBS made a major adjustment with MOVE, broadcasting variety shows from Monday to Thursday, but this did not yield results. However, starting in 1993, with a recovery in TV drama ratings, TBS's prime-time and evening ratings rose to third place from October 1993 to March 1994.

In October 1994, TBS moved into its new headquarters, the TBS Broadcasting Center. During the week of the move, TBS achieved a ratings triple crown. Due to the recovery of the Japanese economy and TBS's improved ratings in the mid-1990s, the turnover of the TBS TV department increased to 192.307 billion yen in 1995. In 1996, the turnover of the TBS TV division exceeded 200 billion yen for the first time.

In April 1995, TBS launched its website. However, in 1996, TBS' link to the Sakamoto family murder by Aum Shinrikyo members in 1989 was made public. This scandal involving TBS intentionally breaking its protection of sources seriously damaged its credibility, leading to the resignation of the company's upper management. In response to this incident, TBS began broadcasting the self-verification program TBS Review in 1997.

In response to the multi-channel landscape introduced by satellite TV, TBS launched its 24-hour news channel, TBS NEWS BIRD (now TBS NEWS DIG), in 1998. On December 1, 2000, TBS's BS satellite TV channel, BS-i (now BS-TBS), officially began broadcasting.

=== Spin-off of TBS TV, restructuring and media development ===
In 2000, TBS established three subsidiaries: TBS Radio and Communications (TBSラジオ&コミュニケーションズ, now TBS Radio), responsible for the radio division; TBS Entertainment (TBSエンタテインメント), responsible for TV program production; and TBS Sports (TBSスポーツ), responsible for sports programs. Concurrently with these structural reforms, TBS introduced the "Ji~n" logo.

In 2001, TBS established TBS LIVE (TBSライブ, now known as U-Next Paravi Corner), which is responsible for producing information programs. That same year, the call sign of TBS TV was changed from JOKR-TV to JORX-TV. On October 1, 2004, TBS merged the three subsidiaries—TBS Entertainment, TBS Sports, and TBS LIVE—into TBS TV, consolidating the wireless TV business into one company (excluding signal broadcasting and personnel brokerage).

On April 1, 2009, TBS adopted the broadcasting holding company system, becoming the second core broadcaster in Japan to do so. The TV broadcasting license was inherited by TBS TV, and the original TBS corporate entity was renamed "Tokyo Broadcasting System Holdings" (now TBS Holdings), becoming a broadcasting holding company that simply holds shares in the group's subsidiaries.

In October 2005, the internet company Rakuten acquired a 19.09% stake in TBS for approximately 88 billion yen, becoming TBS's largest shareholder. Lotte Group proposed establishing a joint stockholding company with TBS for business integration, but TBS rejected this proposal, leading to serious confrontation between the two companies. On November 30 of the same year, Lotte and TBS reached a settlement through financial institutions and agreed to begin business cooperation. However, on February 28, 2007, then TBS President Hiroshi Inoue announced that TBS had terminated its partnership with Lotte and released a new defensive merger plan.

After TBS adopted the broadcasting holding company system, Lotte decided to require TBS to buy back all the shares it held in TBS, as it could no longer control the management rights. In 2010, the Tokyo District Court ruled that TBS should purchase the shares from Rakuten at a price of 1,294 yen per share.

On December 1, 2003, TBS began broadcasting digital TV signals. In the early 2000s, TBS's full-day ratings were surpassed by TV Asahi, and among core stations, TBS was only ahead of TV Tokyo, which had long been trailing. The ratings gap between TBS and TV Asahi in the evening time slot also narrowed. In response, TBS undertook a overhaul of its news and information programs broadcast from Monday to Friday in March 2005. Strip news programs, except for NEWS23 and Hanamaru Market, were replaced with new programs, which improved TBS's daytime ratings.

In March 2009, TBS made another major adjustment to its program schedule, with an adaptation rate exceeding 70%. However, this change ended in failure, and by April 9, 2009, TBS had no programs with ratings exceeding 10%. Despite this, in 2009, the TBS TV series Benevolent Heroic Doctor became the highest-rated series among flagship stations for the year.

On July 24, 2011, TBS ceased analog TV broadcasts. In 2013, the TBS drama Hanzawa Naoki reached an audience rating of 42.2%, becoming one of the most successful dramas in Sunday Theater history and setting a record for the highest ratings of Japanese TV dramas in the era, surpassing foreign TV dramas. Benefiting from the increased ratings of its dramas, TBS's overall ratings also rebounded in recent years. By 2018, TBS's average prime-time rating was 10%, ranking third among core stations.

In 2000, the turnover of the TBS TV division reached 234.203 billion yen, and the group profit hit 30.076 billion yen, both reaching record highs. Faced with slow growth in TV advertising revenue, TBS actively pursued diversification of income sources after the 2000s. TBS partnered with Mitsui Fudosan for large-scale redevelopment in the Akasaka area. The urban redevelopment project, Akasaka Sacas, opened in 2008 and includes facilities such as the 39-story Akasaka Biz Tower. This real estate venture became a significant source of income for TBS.

However, due to sluggish ratings during this period, the real estate business, often referred to as "Akasaka Real Estate" by outsiders, became the main source of profit for TBS. Besides real estate, TBS's investment income from companies like Tokyo Power Technology also contributed to its revenue. In 2019, TBS TV accounted for about 59% of the TBS Group's overall turnover, but its profit accounted for only about 20%, indicating that the profitability of TBS TV was lower than the group average. This trend persisted.

TBS has actively invested in the Internet field in recent years. In 2015, TBS and four other core broadcasters jointly launched the Internet TV service TVer, allowing viewers to watch some TBS programs online for free. In 2018, TBS, TV Tokyo, Nihon Keizai Shimbun, and WOWOW started offering the premium Internet TV service Paravi (now known as U-Next). In September 2021, TBS announced plans to simultaneously broadcast TV programs online before April 2022. Starting April 11, 2022, TBS began broadcasting evening programs on TVer.

In February 2023, TBS Holdings and TV Tokyo announced their merger with U-Next, six years after the launch of Paravi. The merger was approved in July 2023. On the 70th anniversary of TBS's launch, it was announced that a new late-night programming block called "DraMonday☆Night" would be introduced, featuring Profiler: Murder Mysteries, based on a French police procedural drama that aired on TF1.

In July 2023, TBS announced the formation of TBS Games, a division focusing on video game development. Their first project is I Am Adventure Boy: Ultimate Escape Island, a survival game based on the TBS program I Am Adventure Boy, developed by Three Rings for the Nintendo Switch; it was released only in Japan in July 2024. Their first original project is Killer Inn, developed by Canadian developer Tactic Studios and published by Square Enix for Windows.

=== Later history ===
As a consequence of the Fuji Television sexual harassment scandal, TBS decided in January 2025 to end Masahiro Nakai's long-running program Kinsuma, and dropped him as host of the variety show The MC3, which had just started in October 2024. The station also announced that it had launched an internal investigation in accordance with the TBS Group Human Rights Policy, based on a series of reports regarding the relationship between entertainment professionals and TV station staff. About Kinsuma, one thing was noticeable: a group of ladies dressed in red, between 20 and 45 years old, always seated behind him, was made up of mostly aspiring artists and models. The ones on the aisle were to have their bare legs crossed the whole length of the show. The group of ladies stopped appearing after the start of the COVID-19 pandemic in Japan.

== Networks ==
TBS programming is also broadcast on Japan News Network (JNN) affiliate stations nationwide.

== Programs ==
Below is a selection of the many programs broadcast by the network.

=== Sporting competitions ===
- Kinniku Banzuke (筋肉番付, also known as Unbeatable Banzuke in the United States and United Kingdom)
- Sasuke (known as Ninja Warrior in other countries, e.g.:American Ninja Warrior in the United States) an obstacle course based game show, originally part of Kinniku Banzuke
- Kunoichi Sasuke's female counterpart
- Takeshi's Castle (風雲!たけし城)
- Pro Sportsman No.1 (最強の男は誰だ!壮絶筋肉バトル!!スポーツマンNo.1決定戦)
  - Sports Danshi Grand Prix (究極の男は誰だ!?最強スポーツ男子頂上決戦), reboot version of Pro Sportsman No.1.
- KASSO, skateboarding gameshow
- Honoo-no Taiiku-kai TV (炎の体育会TV)
- HANZO, Sasuke's spin-off sports gameshow based on pentathlon.
- MUSOU, cross-over spin-off gameshow based on various physical gameshow such as Takeshi's Castle, Sasuke, Kunoichi, Pro Sportsman No.1, Sports Danshi Grand Prix, DOORS and Tokyo Friend Park.

=== Variety and music ===
- All-Star Thanksgiving (オールスター感謝祭) (Spring/Fall) (1991- )
- Count Down TV (1993- )
- Lincoln (リンカーン) (2005 -2013)
- Masahiro Nakai's Friday Smiles (中居正広の金スマ) (2001 - 2024)
- Quiz ¥20,000,000 Money Drop (2000万円クイズ！マネードロップ) (2012 - 2013)
- The Chance! (ザ・チャンス! ) (1979 - 1986)
- Kuizu 100-nin ni Kikimashita (クイズ100人に聞きました) (1979 - 1992)
- Sanma's Super Karakuri-TV (さんまのスーパーからくりTV) (1992 - 1996 as Karakuri-TV, 1996 - 2014 as Super Karakuri-TV)
- Tokyo Friend Park 2 (関口宏の東京フレンドパークII) (1994 - 2011)
- The Best Ten (ザ・ベストテン) (1978-1989) (the program's best episodes were rerun in 2020 as a special)
- THE MC3 (2024-) (Nakai dropped as host in January 2025)
- Utaban (うたばん) (1996 - 2010)
  - The Music Hour (ザ・ミュージックアワー) (April - September 2010)
- Open the door of knowledge! Door x Door Quest (知識の扉よ開け！ドア×ドア クエスト) (2024- )
- Ongaku no hi (2011- ) (Nakai hosted until 2024. For 2025, station announcers Shinichiro Yasuzumi and Ai Eto take over)

=== Dramas and TV series ===
- Sunday Theater (日曜劇場, since 1956)
- DraMonday☆Night (ドラマンデー☆ナイト, since 2024)
- Tuesday Drama (火曜ドラマ, since 2014)
- Drama Stream (ドラマストリーム, since 2022)
- Dramaism (ドラマイズム, since 2016)
- Friday Prime Drama (金曜ドラマ, since 1972)

=== Information and news programs ===
- The Time, (THE TIME, morning news, since 2021)
- Hiruobi (ひるおび, daytime news, since 2009)
- N-Studio (Nスタ, afternoon and evening news, since 1958)
- News23 (news23, late-night news, since 1959)
- TBS NEWS DIG (TBS NEWS DIG, 24-hour news channel, since 1999)
- Mino Monta no Asa Zuba! (みのもんたの朝ズバッ!!)
- The World Heritage (THE 世界遺産)

=== Special TV shows ===
- Japan Cable Awards (発表!日本有線大賞)
- Japan Record Awards (輝く!日本レコード大賞)
- Tokyo Music Festival (東京音楽祭)

=== Sports coverage ===
==== Football (soccer) ====
- FIFA
  - National teams
  - National teams
    - FIFA World Cup
    - FIFA Women's World Cup
- JFA
  - Japan women's national football team
  - Japan national football team
- AFC
  - AFC Asian Cup (shared with DAZN)

==== Baseball ====
- Nippon Professional Baseball
- World Baseball Classic

==== Volleyball ====
- FIVB
  - FIVB Volleyball Men's World Championship
  - FIVB Volleyball Women's World Championship

==== Golf ====
- The Masters

==== Multi-sport events ====
- Asian Games
- World Athletics Championships
- Olympic Games (via Japan Consortium)
  - Summer Olympic Games
  - Winter Olympic Games
  - Youth Olympic Games

== See also ==
- Hobankyo – organization based in Japan that enforces TBS copyright issues.
- TBS video controversy – alleged cause of the Sakamoto family murder incident
