= MARCH (Japanese universities) =

Five private universities in Japan

MARCH (Japanese: マーチ, Hepburn: Māchi) is the collective name of 5 private universities located in Tokyo, Japan. The name comes from the initial letters of the Japanese Roman characters of each school:

- Meiji University (明治大学, Meiji Daigaku)
- Aoyama Gakuin University (青山学院大学, Aoyama Gakuin Daigaku)
- Rikkyo University (立教大学, Rikkyō Daigaku)
- Chuo University (中央大学, Chūō Daigaku)
- Hosei University (法政大学, Hōsei Daigaku)

== Overview ==
Combined, MARCH universities' alumni include 5 world leaders, 2 Supreme Court Justices, and 6 Olympic medalists. Meiji, Hosei and Rikkyo universities are part of the Top Global University Project of Japan's Ministry of Education, Culture, Sports, Science and Technology.

== Comparison ==
Name	Picture	Year founded	Location in Greater Tokyo	Academic rankings (2023)		
Name	Picture	Year founded	Location in Greater Tokyo	THE	QS Asia	QS World
Meiji University		1881	Chiyoda; Suginami; Nakano; Kawasaki	>2000	291–300	1001–1200
Aoyama Gakuin University		1874	Shibuya; Machida; Sagamihara	>2000	351–400	1201–1400
Rikkyo University		1874	Ikebukuro; Niiza	1601-1800	248	1201–1400
Chuo University		1885	Hachiōji; Bunkyō; Shinjuku	>2000	451–500	>1400
Hosei University		1880	Shinjuku; Koganei; Machida	1401-1600	551–600	>1400

== Extensions ==
=== JMARCH ===
A former extension, Sophia University (上智大学, Jōchi Daigaku), alongside the rest of MARCH, were called JMARCH in the 1960s. The term is no longer used, due to Sophia now being grouped with Waseda and Keio as Japan's top 3 private universities.

=== GMARCH ===
Originating in 2005, GMARCH is a widely used extension of MARCH, with G being Gakushuin University (学習院大学, Gakushūin Daigaku).

=== TMARCH ===
With T standing for Toyo University (東洋大学, Tōyō Daigaku), the extension of TMARCH originated in 2023 as a result of Toyo's rise in prestige and reputation, with observers and pundits often comparing the university with the rest of MARCH.
