= Yoru no Hit Studio =

Japanese music television program

- Title screen from 1976-1985
- Genre: Music
- Presented by: Takehiko Maeda; Mari Nishimura; Shinsuke Minami; Jun Inoue; Ichiro Furutachi; Mariko Kaga
- Composers: Kenjiro Hirose (until Deluxe); Tsugutoshi Gotō (Super)
- Country of origin: Japan
- Original language: Japanese
- No. of episodes: 1,131

Production
- Running time: 54 minutes (regular, Super); 1 hour 50 minutes (Deluxe)
- Production company: Fuji Television

Original release
- Network: FNS (Fuji TV)
- Release: November 4, 1968 – October 3, 1990

Yoru no Hit Studio (夜のヒットスタジオ, Yoru no Hitto Sutajio), was a Japanese music television program. Broadcast live weekly on Fuji TV from 1968 until 1990. During its broadcast history, it frequently changed its titles, presenters, air time and day. The program is also colloquially known as Yoru Hit (夜ヒット, Yoru Hitto) and Hit Studio (ヒットスタジオ, Hitto Sutajio).

During its broadcast time since 1978, a superior TBS music program The Best Ten (ザ・ベストテン, Za Besuto Ten) start broadcast, which unlike Yoru no Hit Studio, includes its own music ranking chart, which was similar to Oricon Music Charts and their rankings were equally recognized.

Since the end of program in 1990, between 1991 and 1997 various special programs were broadcast once a year. The program has been re-broadcast on the cable television channel Fuji TV One from 1999 until 2011. The order of broadcasting was from the July 1976 broadcast until March 2009 (later again in October 2023), and from April 2009 onward 2011, the broadcasts were broadcast retroactively from the April 1974.

In May 2010, Oricon Style published the results of the national survey of "Music programs that I would like to see revived", Yoru no Hit Studio placed second place behind The Best Ten, which placed first place. In November 2023, news website Shunkan Josei Prime published the same survey, Yoru no Hit Studio placed second place behind The Best Ten, which placed first place, both of them regaining same place as in 2010 survey charts. The surveyors answered the reason behind revival for Gorgeous stage sets, full chorus singing with live orchestra performance, singers performing songs from a wide range of genres, collaboration projects, beautiful costumes.

== History ==
Yoru no Hit Studio was a weekly one-hour (in later years almost two-hour) music program. Many Japanese musical acts make their television performance debut on Yoru no Hit Studio, but the show has also hosted many artists from all around the world. For the solo artist, they were always accompanied by Fuji TV studio's orchestral band, who played on live. In the span of 22 years, over 1131 episodes were broadcast, more than 1,000 artists performed and approximately 13,000 songs were performed.

=== Yoru no Hit Studio (1968-1985) ===
From October 24, 1968, to March 25, 1985, Yoru no Hit Studio was broadcast live on Sundays from 22:00–22:54 JST. Until the second half of 1970s, the show was divided into comic variety and music show within the time spawn.

=== Yoru no Hit Studio Deluxe (1985-1989) ===
From April 3, 1985, to September 27, 1989, Yoru no Hit Studio has been renamed to Yoru no Hit Deluxe (夜のヒットスタジオDELUXE, Yoru no Hitto Sutajio Derakkusu) and changed its broadcast day from Sundays to Wednesdays from 21:02–22:52 JST, at the same time renewed broadcast time from 54 minutes to 1 hour and 50 minutes. The reason behind the changes were announced during the time "to please people with more international type of music and extend length of the performance to the full chorus". Reflecting the upcoming changes, there occasional were sets up that featured live appearances by that-time popular overseas artists.

=== Yoru no Hit Studio Super (1989-1990) ===
From April 3, 1985, to September 27, 1990, Yoru no Hit Studio Deluxe has been renamed to Yoru no Hit Super (夜のヒットスタジオSUPER, Yoru no Hitto Sutajio Sūpa) and changed its broadcast day from Sundays to Wednesdays from 22:00–22:54 JST, at the same time broadcast time shortened to its half and origin time, 54 minutes.

The reason for the change was for the viewership ratings that suffered from a serious decline, and from around this time onwards, the huge production costs expended on each broadcast began to rise. Following the drastic budget cut, frequency of appearances by big-name artists, who has appeared regularly weekly, has rapidly decreased to make only appearance once in one or two months. By transferring the name of period from Shōwa to Heisei, coupled changes for the composition of the program, such as live music by a big band, the use of handwritten captions, and the relay medley at the opening, and the formula itself began to have a strong impression to younger audience that it was being "outdated," which further accelerated the loss of viewers.

As a result of a bad management choices for changes and week by week rapid decrease of the view ranting, on September 4, 1990, Fuji Television officially decided to end the program. In response to this, three episodes of a special program entitled "22 Years of Thank You Month" broadcast on the same month, and then on October 3 of the same year, a special program "Thank You & Goodbye Night Hit" was broadcast in a 3-hour time slot. Studio" broadcast.

By the end of Yoru no Hit Studio, the new music program successor Hit Parade 90's start broadcast and was moved to Fridays at 23:00 JST. The success way below the expectations, within the year the broadcast was canceled. Until 1993, there was no music program on Fuji TV. In 1994, a new true successor of Yoru no Hit Studio Hey! Hey! Hey! Music Champ began to air and was hosted from the beginning until the end by the comedy duo Downtown, which consists of Hitoshi Matsumoto and Masatoshi Hamada. The broadcast lasted until 2012.

== Presenters ==
Yoru no Hit Studio has been hosted during its entire history of broadcast in total by 4 male presenters and 2 female presenters, marking Mari Yoshimura the longest among the all presents in span of 17 years.

In 2020, Furutachi launched his YouTube channel. In some of his video, he talks about inside-stories during his time of hosting the program. Some of the stories are exclusively published only in the news websites. In 2017 Fraglab interview, Yoshimura confessed about wearing over 2000 different outfits during her time as presenter.

| Year | Main Male | Main Female | Sub |
|---|---|---|---|
| 1968-1973 | Takehiko Maeda (前田武彦) | Mari Yoshimura (芳村真理) | - |
| 1974-1975 | Shinsuke Minami (三波伸介) | Mari Yoshimura (芳村真理) | Yukiji Asaoka (朝丘雪路) |
| 1975-1976 | Shinsuke Minami (三波伸介) | Mari Yoshimura (芳村真理) | - |
| 1976-1985 | Jun Inoue (井上順) | Mari Yoshimura (芳村真理) | - |
| 1985-1988 | Ichiro Furutachi (古舘伊知郎) | Mari Yoshimura (芳村真理) | - |
| 1988-1989 | Ichiro Furutachi (古舘伊知郎) | - | Toshio Shiba (柴俊夫) |
| 1989-1990 | Ichiro Furutachi (古舘伊知郎) | Mariko Kaga (加賀まりこ) | - |

== Segments ==
Yoru no Hit Studio was home to various weekly and monthly segments, the most common being the opening medley, which occurred weekly. The other segments were discontinued after some time of period or not be part of the weekly schedule.

=== Opening Medley ===
The singer sings a phrase from another singer's song, then hands the microphone to the owner of the song that was just sung. The following sings repeats the same thing to next singers. Similar to a baton relay, person sing a medley of other person's songs, only one phrase at a time, and at the very end, the singer on the final sings the 1-chorus of his own song sung by the previous singer. By that time the performers assemble together and after songs ends, the segment ends. In broadcasts around Christmas time, the medley songs were sometimes changed to only Christmas themed songs.

=== Lucky Telephone Present ===
A viewer participation corner was held at the ending of the broadcast. After extracting the last four or five digits of the phone number from a random number table, applicants among the viewers corresponding to those phone numbers are searched from the applicant data registered in advance on the computer, and then one applicant is selected at random. The prize money at the beginning of the program was 50,000 yen, but it was later increased to the maximum amount 100,000 yen. In some cases, if only slot numbers are 0, the maximum amount was automatically given. In 1987, the segment changed its name to Yoru Hit Telephone Card (夜ヒットテレカ, Yoru Hitto Tereka). Instead of the money, photos which were taken during the broadcast of the program turned into telephone cards and were presented to viewers, who applied.

=== Invitations and Meeting ===
A segment, where either family, relatives or friends, staff the recording company or label related to guest singers are invited to the studio and have a conversation with the singer/host. Another part of the segment was where guests were directly connected over the phone to the singer from the studio, and the host led the show in order to hear about the singer's past or childhood memories and hidden episodes in his personal life.

=== Farewell Corner Project ===
A special segment, which aired only during the times, when a singer retired or a music group disband, making their final television appearance. In the most of cases, only one part of the program featured a special section called "Sayonara", however in case, when a singer Momoe Yamaguchi retired, the entire broadcast episode was devoted to the Goodbye project. The final farewell corner aired in 1988.

=== Drama ===
An acting performance of sings with the fictional story and artist themselves being part or main character of the story. The drama segment only aired during its beginning of the broadcast until 1976.

== Specials ==
In annual occasions, Yoru no Hit Studio held various specials from various places in Japan and sometimes broadcast location in Europe and Asia. Some of these include, broadcast anniversary specials and such. These can range from the regular broadcast time from 2 to 3 hours in length. There will also be various specials with no actual artists performances, these will often be the current hosts discussing the history of the shows and playing some of the more notable performances from archived videotape recorder (known in Japanese as VTR).

Notes: Broadcast times, unless otherwise noted, were aired in the regular broadcast time.

=== Broadcast anniversary specials (1974-1990) ===
- Yoru no Hit Studio 300th episode broadcast anniversary - August 5, 1974
- Yoru no Hit Studio 400th episode broadcast anniversary - July 5, 1976
- Yoru no Hit Studio 500th episode broadcast anniversary - May 29, 1978
- Yoru no Hit Studio 600th episode broadcast anniversary - May 12, 1980
- Yoru no Hit Studio 700th episode broadcast anniversary - April 26, 1982
- Yoru no Hit Studio 800th episode broadcast anniversary - March 26, 1984
- Yoru no Hit Studio Final Sunday - March 25, 1985, (52 minute special)
- Yoru no Hit Studio Deluxe 900th episode broadcast anniversary - March 2, 1986
- Yoru no Hit Studio Deluxe 1000th episode broadcast anniversary - February 10, 1988 (2 hour and 45 minute special)
- Yoru no Hit Studio Super Arigatou & Sayonara - October 3, 1990 (3 hour and 48 minute special)

=== Special Location Projects (1975-1990) ===
- Yoru no Hit Studio in Okinawa Ocean Expo - August 11, 1975
- Yoru no Hit Studio in Hiroshima - October 20, 1975
- Yoru no Hit Studio in Oiso Long Beach - July 11, 1977
- Yoru no Hit Studio in Seibu Stadium - October 8, 1979
- Yoru no Hit Studio in Ashi Lakeside Hakone Garden - June 23, 1980
- Yoru no Hit Studio in Yoyogi Daiichi Gymnasium - October 10, 1983
- Yoru no Hit Studio Deluxe in London - February 3, 1988
- Yoru no Hit Studio Deluxe 20th year broadcast anniversary in Salzburg - November 30, 1988
- Yoru no Hit Studio Deluxe in Paris - March 29, 1989 (1 hour and 13 minute special)
- Yoru no Hit Studio Deluxe in Yokohama Arena - May 5, 1989
- Yoru no Hit Studio Super in Hong Kong - April 25, 1990 (1 hour and 22 minute special)

=== Revival Specials (1990-1997) ===
- Yoru no Hit Studio "Nenmatsu Request" - 26 December 1990 (2 hour and 24 minute special)
- Yoru no Hit Studio "Ano 1 Kyoku-Seishun Jidai Hen" - 3 April 1991 (1 hour and 56 minute special)
- Yoru no Hit Studio "Shimabara Special" - 3 July 1991 (2 hour and 10 minute special)
  - Resurrected for charity to help victims of the Mount Unzen eruption. Donations were accepted by phone from the start of the live broadcast until after it ended.
- Yoru no Hit Studio "Returns Special" - 31 March 1993 (3 hour and 3 minute special)
- Yoru no Hit Studio "Aki Special" - 12 October 1994 (3 hour and 3 minute special)
- Yoru no Hit Studio "Xmas Deluxe" - 24 December 1994 (1 hour and 54 minute special)
- Yoru no Hit Studio "Haru Special" - 5 April 1995 (3 hour and 14 minute special)
- Yoru no Hit Studio "Xmas Special" - 23 December 1995 (1 hour and 54 minute special)
- Yoru no Hit Studio "Sakura Mankai Deluxe" - 3 April 1996 (2 hour and 8 minute special)
- Yoru no Hit Studio "Xmas Deluxe in New York" - 25 December 1996 (1 hour and 39 minute special)
- Yoru no Hit Studio "That's Odaiba Entertainment! Night 1: Utabangumi no 38nen" - 31 March 1997 (2 hour and 24 minute special)

== Releases ==
Prior from the 2010s decade until present, a numerous of special DVD-box sets were released by the high demand of the artist fans. The discs include full footage of the performances, however in some occasions before-performance talks were completely cut off and not showed at all.

=== DVD set-boxes ===
| Release | Title | Format | Label | Serial No. | Reference |
|---|---|---|---|---|---|
| 30 June 2010 | Momoe Yamaguchi in Yoru no Hit Studio | 6DVD | Fuji Television | AVBD-91791 | |
| 22 December 2010 | Akina Nakamori in Yoru no Hit Studio | 6DVD | Universal Sigma | POBD-22017 | |
| 27 May 2011 | Pink Lady in Yoru no Hit Studio | 4DVD | Pony Canyon | PCBC-61679 | |
| 21 December 2011 | Kenji Sawada in Yoru no Hit Studio | 6DVD | Universal Sigma | PCBC-61679 | |
| 16 May 2020 | Hideki Saijo in Yoru no Hit Studio | 6DVD | Sony Records | PCBC-61679 | |
| 18 October 2023 | Hiromi Go in Yoru no Hit Studio | 7DVD | Sony Records | PCBC-61679 | |

=== Other media ===
| Release | Title | Label | Note | Reference |
|---|---|---|---|---|
| 27 NOvember 2013 | Live Core (Limited Version) Yutaka Ozaki in Tokyo Dome 1988/9/12 | Warner Music Japan | limited edition of DVD includes footage of television appearance from the Yoru no Hit Studio | |

== Publications ==
=== Books ===
| Title | Author | Release | Publisher | ISBN |
|---|---|---|---|---|
| Yoru no Hit Studio Boku no Star Meikan (夜のヒットスタジオ ぼくのスター名鑑) | Takehiko Maeda | 1969 | Shin-Jinbutsuoraisha | 874113258O |
| Yoshimura Mari no Yoru no Hit Studio Deluxe (芳村真理の夜のヒットスタジオDELUXE) | collective author | 1 June 1988 | Fuji Television | ISBN 978-4594002527 |

== See also ==
- The Best Ten
