= Naoki Monna =

Japanese sociologist

Naoki Monna (門奈 直樹, Monna Naoki; born 1942 in Shizuoka, Japan) is a Japanese sociologist who is Emeritus professor of Rikkyo University (St. Paul university) in Tokyo. At present, a professor at Kyoto Sangyo University in Kyoto. In July 1965 he graduated from Doshisha University. His specialized field is Mass Communication, Journalism, risk management and citizen journalism.

== Publications ==
- The new media of contemporary (Gakubunsya) 1984.
- The current journalism (Nihon hyoronsya) 1993.
- The History of press control in Okinawa (Yuzankaku)1996.
- The Broadcasting of digital era (Gakubunsya) 1997
- The turning point - Where is Japan going to (Mainichi shinbun) 2000
- The history of people's journalism in Japan - era of civil rights to Okinawa occupation (Kodansya gakujyutsu bunko) 2001.
- The science of journalism (Yuhikaku) 2001.
- The current war report (Iwanami shinsyo)2004.
- Broadcasting system ethics and journalism in the age of digital-'97 Anglo-Japanese Broadcasting Forum- (1997)
