= TBS Holdings =

Japanese media and broadcasting company

TBS Holdings, Inc.
- Logo used since 1 April 2020

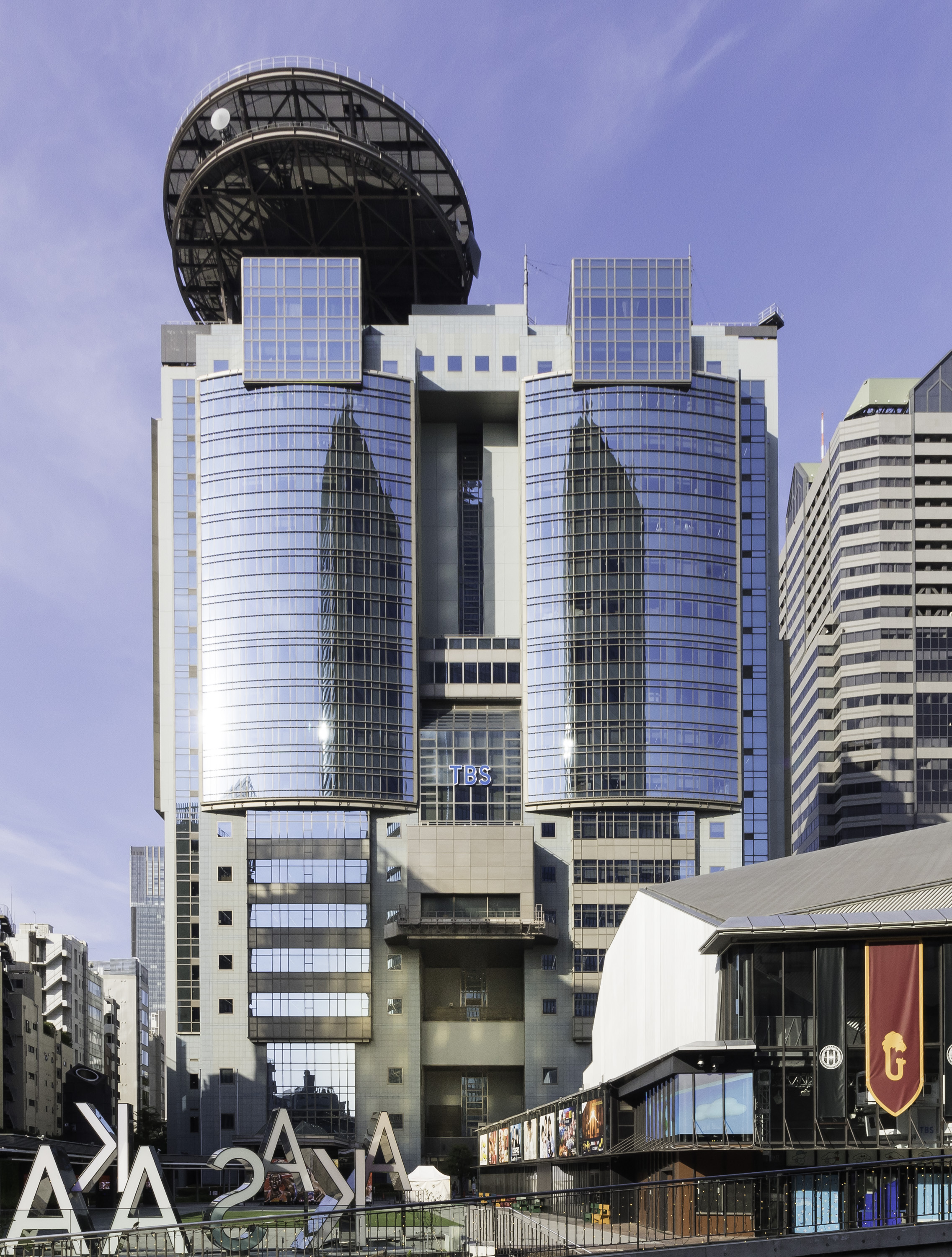
- Headquarters in Minato, Tokyo
- Trade name: TBS, TBS HD
- Native name: 株式会社TBSホールディングス
- Romanized name: Kabushiki gaisha TBS Hōrudingusu
- Formerly: Radio Tokyo, Inc. (1951–1960); Tokyo Broadcasting System, Inc. (1960–2009); Tokyo Broadcasting System Holdings, Inc. (2009–2020)
- Type: Public
- Traded as: TYO: 9401
- Industry: Media
- Founded: 17 May 1951 (75 years ago) in Tokyo, Japan
- Headquarters: TBS Broadcasting Center, Akasaka, Minato, Tokyo, Japan
- Area served: Worldwide
- Services: Broadcast television and radio
- Revenue: ▼¥342,754 million (consolidated, March 2011)
- Operating income: ▲¥7,705 million (consolidated, March 2011)
- Net income: ▲¥103 million (consolidated, March 2011)
- Total assets: ▼¥593,023 million (consolidated, March 2011)
- Total equity: ▼¥344,658 million (consolidated, March 2011)
- Owner: MTBJ investment trusts (10.4%; 5.3% managed for Dentsu (largest shareholder)); MBS Media Holdings (5%); SMBC (3.2%); Mitsui Fudosan (3.1%); NTT (3.1%)
- Number of employees: 5,271
- Subsidiaries: List: TBS Radio; TBS Television; BS-TBS; TBS Sparkle; TBS Glowdia; TBS Act; The Seven; TBS Media Research Institute; TBS International; Nichion; Seven Arcs; CS-TBS
- Website: http://www.tbsholdings.co.jp/

TBS Holdings, Inc., (Note: 株式会社TBSホールディングス, Kabushiki gaisha TBS Hōrudingusu) (formerly Tokyo Broadcasting System Holdings, Inc., (Note: 株式会社東京放送ホールディングス, Kabushiki-gaisha Tōkyō Hōsō Hōrudingusu)) is a privately owned media company in Japan. It is the parent company of the television network TBS Television and radio network TBS Radio. It has a 28-affiliate television network called Japan News Network, as well as a 34-affiliate radio network called Japan Radio Network.

TBS produced the game show Takeshi's Castle and has also broadcast the Ultra Series programs and Sasuke (Ninja Warrior), whose format would inspire similar programs outside Japan. TBS is a member of the Mitsui Group keiretsu and often collaborates with the Mainichi Shimbun despite its lack of shareholding.

== History ==
Former TBS logos used from August 1961 to September 1991, and from January 1994 to March 2020, both the same black-colored of the classic CBS logo
- May 1951 - Radio Tokyo (株式会社ラジオ東京; KRT, the predecessor of TBS) was founded in Kasumigaseki in Chiyoda, Tokyo.
- December 25, 1951 - KRT began radio broadcasting (1130 kHz, 50 kW) from Yurakucho, Chiyoda, Tokyo
- July 1953 - KRTs radio broadcast frequency changed to 950 kHz.
- April 1955 - KRT began TV broadcasting (JOKR-TV, Channel 6) from Akasaka-Hitotsukicho in Minato, Tokyo.
- August 1, 1959 - Japan News Network (JNN) was formed.
- November 29, 1960 - KRT was renamed Tokyo Broadcasting System, Inc. (Note: 株式会社東京放送; TBS) The headquarters and radio studio moved to the main building in Akasaka.
- August 1961 - KRT was renamed Tokyo Broadcasting System (TBS), and unveiled the cursive logo.
- July 17, 1966 - Ultraman began airing, and became popular in Japan.
- October 1, 1967 - Ultraseven began airing, and received higher popularity and viewer ratings.
- 1971 - TBS Radio's transmitter power was increased to 100 kW.
- March 31, 1975 - Asahi Broadcasting Corporation (ABC) dropped out and JNN and Mainichi Broadcasting System (MBS) joined the news network due to ownership issues with ABC. Since then, MBS has been an affiliated TV station of JNN in Osaka and Kansai region.
- November 23, 1978 - The frequency for TBS Radio was moved to 954 kHz.
- May 2, 1986 - TBS began broadcasting the game show Takeshi's Castle.
- 1989 - TBS became culpable in the Sakamoto family murder by Aum Shinrikyo, which resulted in complaints against the network after the case was solved.
- October 19, 1990 - The last episode of Takeshi's Castle was broadcast on TBS.
- September 20, 1991 - TBS entered into an agreement with American network CBS News for newscasts and satellite relays.
- October 3, 1994 - The present headquarters, TBS Broadcasting Center (also called "Big Hat (ビッグハット)"), were completed next to the old headquarters (later renamed as Akasaka Media Building until its demolition in 2003). Nine months later a third logo was unveiled.
- April 1, 1998 - JNN News Bird began broadcasting. The channel was later renamed TBS News Bird in 2006.
- February 2000 - TBS adopted a symbol based on the Kanji symbol for "person".
- March 21, 2000 - TBS founded TBS Radio & Communications Inc. (株式会社ティ・ビー・エス・ラジオ・アンド・コミュニケーションズ→株式会社TBSラジオ&コミュニケーションズ), TBS Entertainment Inc. (株式会社ティ・ビー・エス・エンタテインメント), and TBS Sports Inc. (株式会社ティ・ビー・エス・スポーツ). They began TBS Live Inc. (株式会社ティ・ビー・エス・ライブ) the next day. On October 1, 2001, TBS changed the name of the radio station to TBS Radio & Communications and changed the callsign of TV station (JOKR-TV → JORX-TV).
- July 1, 2002 - TBS ch. began broadcasting on pay television.
- October 1, 2004 - TBS Entertainment merged TBS Sports and TBS Live and changed the corporate name to Tokyo Broadcasting System Television, Inc. (株式会社TBSテレビ).
- October 13, 2005 - Rakuten Inc. announced its purchase of a 15.46 percent stake in TBS, bringing Rakuten's total stake up to 19%.
- December 1, 2005 - After worries of a possible hostile takeover, Rakuten withdrew its bid for TBS and planned to form a business alliance with the broadcast company instead.
- April 1, 2006 - Digital terrestrial broadcasts commence.
- April 1, 2009 - TBS became a certified broadcast holding company named Tokyo Broadcasting System Holdings, Inc. Its TV broadcasting and other operations were taken over by Tokyo Broadcasting System Television, Inc. and the letters TBS were used for the abbreviation of its subsidiary company.
- March 14, 2011 - A special news program was broadcast without commercials three days after the Great East Japan earthquake and tsunami and the subsequent Fukushima nuclear disaster.
- December 1, 2011 - TBS sold the Yokohama BayStars, a Nippon Professional Baseball team, to DeNA. DeNA buys 66.92 percent of the team's stock for 6.5 billion yen from TBS. TBS retained a 2.31 percent ownership stake in the team.
- April 1, 2016 - TBS Holdings subsidiary, TBS Radio and Communications was renamed TBS Radio.
- April 1, 2020 - After 26 years, TBS unveiled an updated logo.
- October 1, 2020 - Tokyo Broadcasting System Holdings, Inc. was renamed TBS Holdings, Inc., to commemorate the 70th anniversary of the company since 1950.

== Criticism ==
=== Sakamoto family murders ===
TBS was accused of failing to protect its sources in October 1989, when it taped an interview with Tsutsumi Sakamoto about his investigation of the Aum Shinrikyo sect. The network secretly showed a video of the interview to Aum members without Sakamoto's knowledge. Aum officials pressured TBS to cancel the planned broadcast of the interview, but Sakamoto, his wife, and child were murdered by Aum members on 3 November.

== See also ==
- Hobankyo - Organization based in Japan which enforces TBS copyright issues
