= Rikkyo Niiza Junior and Senior High School =

Private school in Saitama Prefecture, Japan

Coordinates: 35.8151°N 139.5676°E

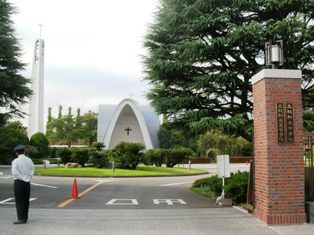
Rikkyo Niiza Junior and Senior High School

Rikkyo Niiza Junior and Senior High School (立教新座中学校・高等学校, Rikkyō Niiza Chūgakkō Kōtōgakkō) is a private boys' junior and senior high school in Niiza, Saitama Prefecture, Japan, in the Tokyo metropolitan area. It is affiliated with Rikkyo University.

First established at Ikebukuro in 1948, Rikkyo Senior High School moved to a new campus at Niiza in 1960. The landmark school chapel designed by architect Antonin Raymond, was consecrated in 1963.

In 2000 the school was renamed Rikkyo Niiza Senior High School and on the same campus a new junior high school program was established, matching developments at Ikebukuro where Rikkyo Ikebukuro Junior and Senior High School provides a similar six year integrated high school program. The schools' current main buildings as well as St. Paul's Field and gymnasium all opened in 2014.

Since 1990, adjacent to the junior and senior high school facilities, the campus at Niiza also serves as a secondary campus for first and second year undergraduate students of Rikkyo University.

== Notable alumni ==
=== Politicians ===
- Osamu Uno
- Toshio Ogawa
- Ryosei Tanaka

=== Artists ===
- Hiroshi Sugimoto, photographer
- Oji Hiroi, video game developer
- Nariaki Obukuro, singer

=== Athletes ===
- Nobuhide Tachi, racing driver
- Kazushige Nagashima, baseball player
- Kenji Tomura, baseball player
- Takayuki Takabayashi, baseball player

=== Performers ===
- Hiroshi Sekiguchi, actor
- Haruomi Hosono, leader of Yellow Magic Orchestra
- Yukihiro Takahashi, drummer of Yellow Magic Orchestra
- Motoharu Sano, musician
- Taro Yamaguchi, voice actor

=== Presenters ===
- Monta Mino
- Ichiro Furutachi

=== Others ===
- Akihiko Honda, boxing promoter
