= Hobankyo =

The Hobankyo decal one would find on a licensed product. The kanji in the background says "放番協 認定ビデオ", or "Hobankyo certified video."

The Hōsō Bangumi Chosakuken Hogo Kyōgikai (放送番組著作権保護協議会), commonly abbreviated as Hōbankyō (放番協), and known in English as the Council for Protection of Copyright of Television Program of Japan is an organization representing Japan-based television networks, motion picture producers, Japanese anime manufacturers, screenwriters and record companies. Hōbankyō enforces intellectual property laws in areas both within and outside Japan for their clients. In cooperation with other domestic and international law enforcement agencies around the world, Hōbankyō cracks down on organizations that illegally distribute Japanese entertainment content protected by Hōbankyō.

For-sale and rental items outside Japan come under Hōbankyō. To legally sell items protected by Hōbankyō, stores must obtain licenses from Hōbankyō. For video rental items, Hōbankyō issues a holographic decal that is placed on the item.

Other names referencing Hōbankyō include Hōsō Bangumi Kyōkai.

== Legal proceedings ==
=== F-Shrine (2005) ===
According to Article 30 of Japan's Copyright Act, a person is allowed to record and distribute television content for personal use, as long as the content is used domestically (i.e. within Japan). It is referred to as shiteki-fukusei (私的複製) or "private duplication" (equivalent to the fair use doctrine in the U.S.). The recordings can then be sent to family and friends for their personal use. However, F-Shrine tried to create a business model based on shiteki-fukusei, and the practice was eventually deemed illegal in Tokyo District Court.

F-Shrine claimed that their activities fell under shiteki-fukusei, in that the user owned the equipment, he paid for the TV feeds, and he did all the programming himself. F-Shrine just provided the facilities. Even though a "hand and foot" transaction (the user physically walking over to the facility and obtaining the video) wasn't done in this scenario, the process should still be deemed legal. And, the actual video content was not sold or rented. Hōbankyō, however, claimed that these users must also be physically living in Japan in order for shiteki-fukusei to take effect.

=== J Network (2009) ===
Two employees of Bangkok-based company J Network Service were arrested on charges of violating Japan's copyright law. Both defendants live in Japan, and used servers in several dozen locations throughout Japan to transmit broadcast TV out to customers via the Internet for a fee. Fuji Television notified the authorities in June 2008 about the subscription business, and later reported two violations of copyright to the authorities in February 2009 for transmitting the day-time talk show Gokigenyo through J Network.

== Members ==
Below is an incomplete list of members.

- TBS
- NHK
- TV Asahi
- Fuji Television (Fuji TV)
- TV Tokyo

== See also ==
- Japanese copyright law
