= Rikkyo University =

Private university in Tokyo, Japan

Coordinates: 35°43′50″N 139°42′14″E

- 立教大学
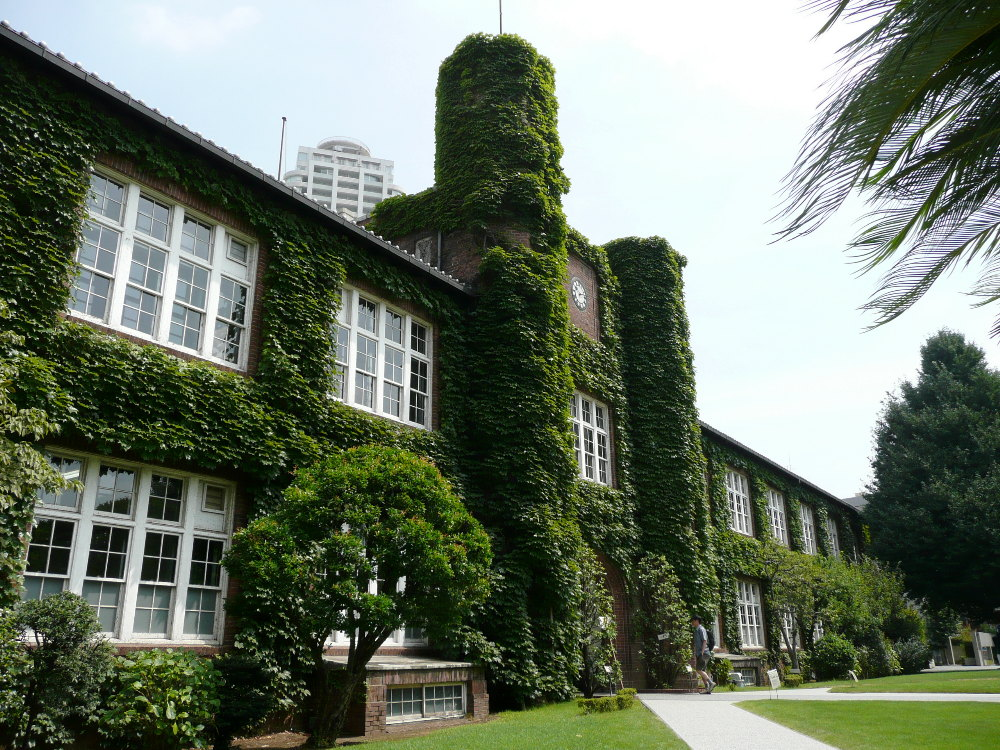
- Main building, Ikebukuro Campus
- Motto: Pro Deo et Patria
- Motto in English: For God and Country
- Type: Private
- Established: 1874
- Affiliations: AALAU
- Religious affiliation: Anglican Church
- Endowment: US$435.1 million (JP¥50.3 billion)
- President: Renta Nishihara
- Faculty: 608 full-time, 1,674 part-time
- Undergraduates: 19,481
- Postgraduates: 1,231
- Location: Toshima, Tokyo, Japan
- Campus: Urban
- Member of: Tokyo 6 Universities
- Mascot: None
- Website: www.rikkyo.ac.jp

University rankings
Global
QS	General	1201-1400

Regional
QS Asia (Asia version)	General	213

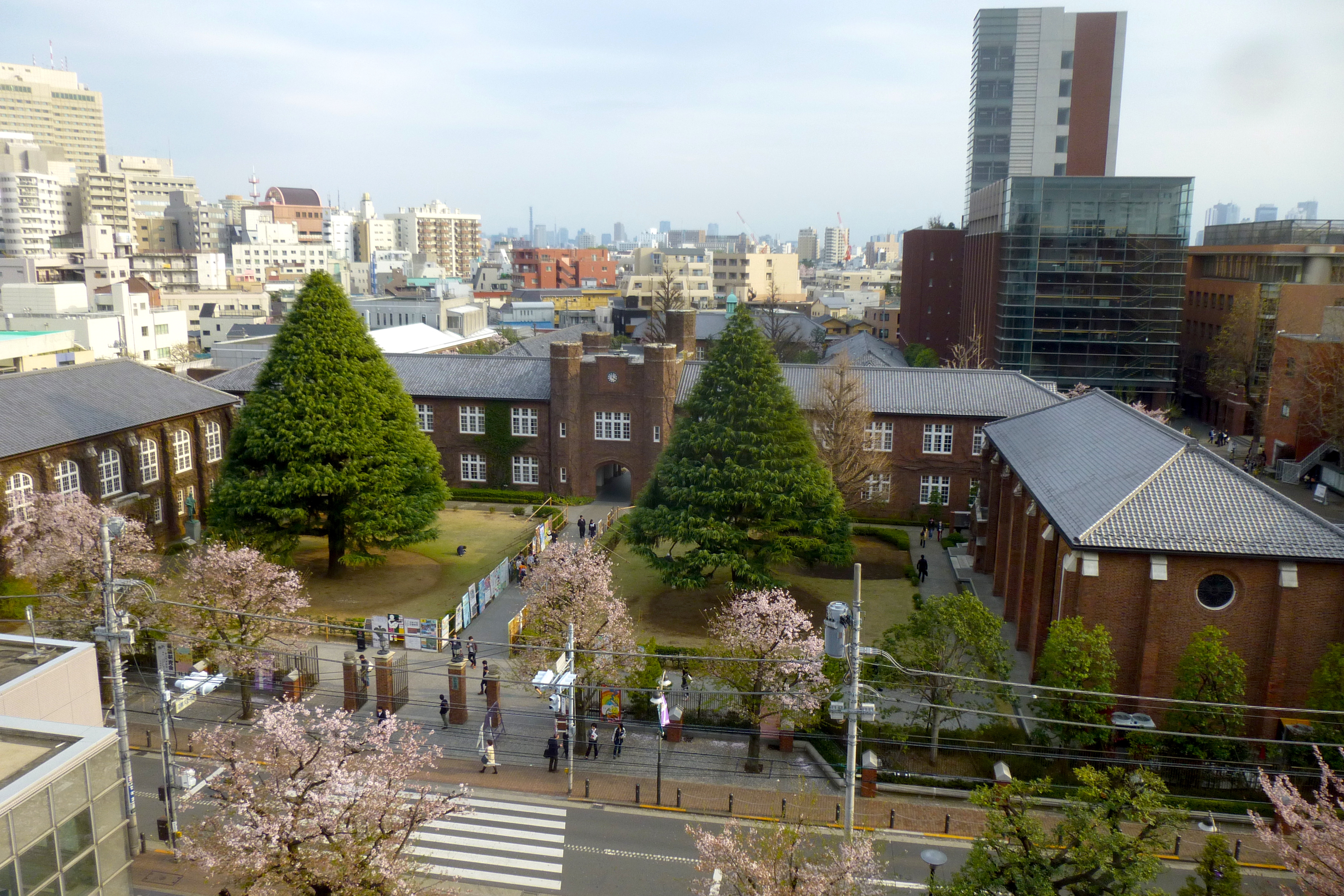
Rikkyo University, Tokyo

Rikkyo University (立教大学, Rikkyō daigaku), also known as Saint Paul's University, is a private university, in Ikebukuro, Tokyo, Japan.

Rikkyo is one of the five MARCH universities, the group of private universities in the Kanto region, together with Meiji, Aoyama Gakuin, Chuo, and Hosei. Rikkyo is known as one of the six leading universities in the field of sports in Tokyo (東京六大学 "Big Six" — Rikkyo University, University of Tokyo, Keio University, Waseda University, Meiji University, and Hosei University).

The university is the largest Anglican Christian affiliated university in Japan. The university is involved in numerous international programmes and projects. Rikkyo maintains contact with more than 140 educational institutions abroad for the purpose of exchanging lecturers, students and projects. With more than 700 students from outside Japan, the institution has 20,000 students, and 2,700 teachers and staff members.

== Rikkyo Gakuin ==
The Rikkyo Gakuin is an educational institution, which includes Rikkyo University and several affiliated schools. They include three all-male schools and an international school, The Rikkyo School in England. Rikkyo Gakuin's sister schools include three all-female schools and, formerly, a junior college (St. Margaret's Junior College).

=== Boys' schools ===
- Rikkyo Primary School
- Rikkyo Ikebukuro Junior and Senior High School
- Rikkyo Niiza Junior and Senior High School

=== Girls' schools ===
==== Rikkyo Jogakuin ====
- St. Margaret's Elementary School, AKA Rikkyo Girls' Elementary School
- St. Margaret's Junior & Senior High School, AKA Rikkyo Girls' Junior & Senior High School

==== Kouran Jogakuin ====
- St. Hilda's Junior & Senior High School, AKA Kouran Girls' Junior & Senior High School

== History ==
=== Founding ===
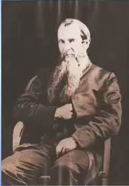
Bishop Channing Moore Williams, Anglican missionary and founder of Rikkyo University

The origins of the university date from the founding of St. Paul's School for boys in 1874 by Channing Moore Williams, a missionary of the Episcopal Church and a leading figure in the establishment of the Anglican Church in Japan.

The school's first classes were held in Williams' home in the foreign settlement in Tsukiji, Tokyo. Initially five students came to study with the resident missionaries. By the end of the first year this number had grown to 55 with as many as 46 living in a dormitory rented by the school.

Fire devoured the first school buildings in 1876. With funding from the Domestic and Foreign Mission Society of the Protestant Episcopal Church and, in 1880, a new principal, James McDonald Gardiner to supervise, new three-story brick facilities with an imposing 60-foot spire were constructed.

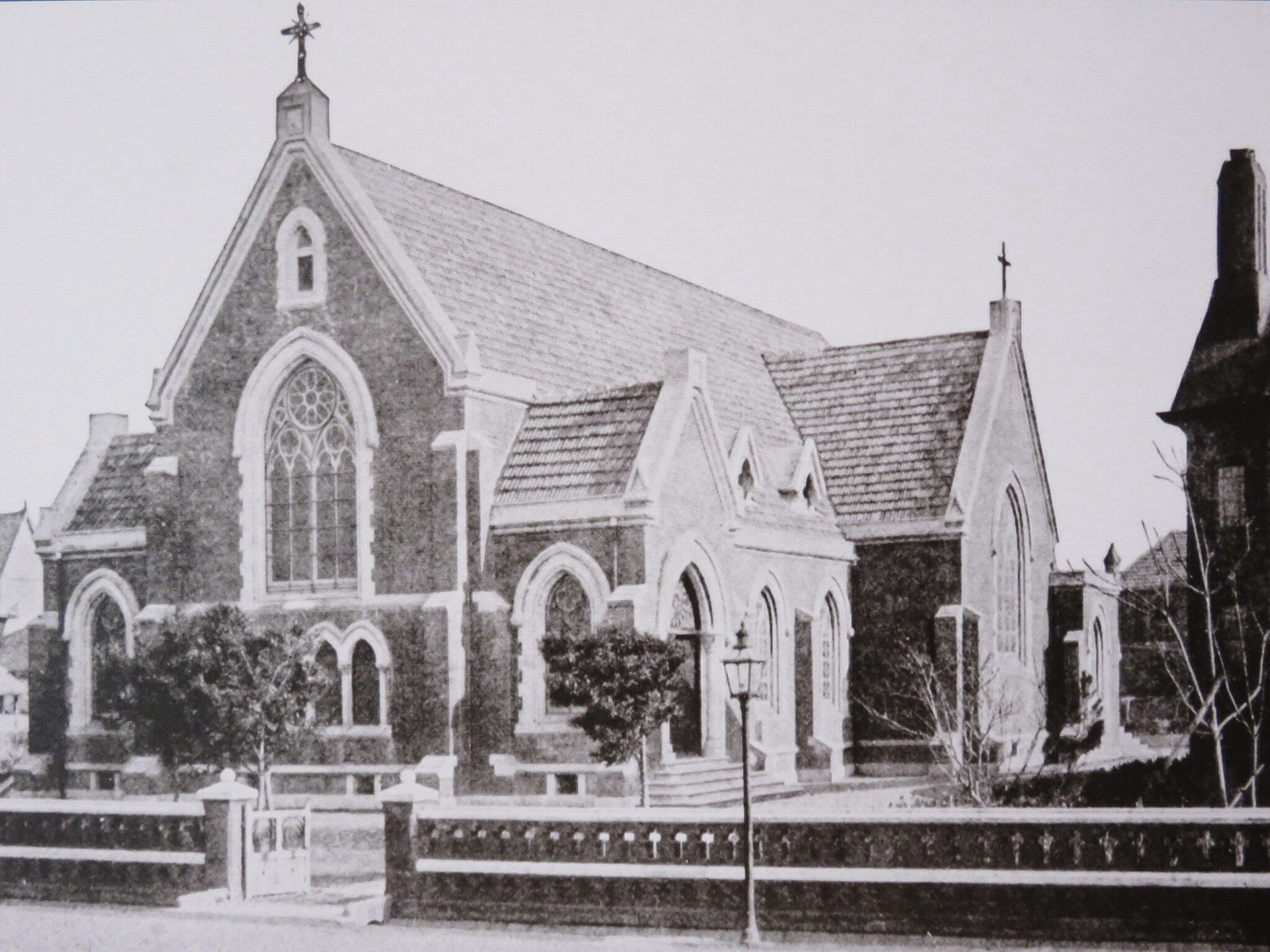
Holy Trinity Cathedral, Tsukiji, temporary home for the college after the 1894 earthquake

In 1891, Gardiner resigned from the management of the school and was succeeded by Rev. Theodosius Stevens Tyng. Simultaneous with the appointment of Rev. Tyng, the school's name was changed from St. Paul's School to St. Paul's College; curriculum changes were introduced; and a formal application was made for a government license. Enrollment jumped, but the school buildings were in a poor state of repair and were condemned as unsafe by government inspectors. As president of the school Tyng immediately set off to the United States on a fundraising tour. Less than three weeks after his return to Tokyo an earthquake in 1894 leveled much of the original school facilities, highlighting the perils of building on reclaimed land next to the Sumida River. The college was temporarily housed in Trinity Parish House, and by 1896 new buildings including an academic hall and student dormitory were ready for occupation.

In 1897, the Rev. Arthur Lloyd became president of the university. The Rikkyo schools experienced a rapid rise in student enrollment by virtue of the granting of a government license exempting students from military service and granting them access to all government established schools of higher education. Lloyd navigated the school through a turbulent six years as the Japanese Ministry of Education sought to curtail any religious instruction in the curriculum of government-approved schools. As only in the dormitories at Rikkyo was any religious instruction given, the school was able to retain its license.

In 1903, the Rev. Henry St. George Tucker succeeded Rev. Lloyd as president. In 1905 the school reported a male student enrollment of 573 and the need for larger school classroom facilities was acute. After another successful fundraising appeal new classrooms, an assembly hall and an office building were opened in 1907. The Rev. Charles S. Reifsnider succeed Rev. Tucker in 1912 when the latter took up his new post as Bishop of Kyoto.

=== New campus and elevation to university status ===
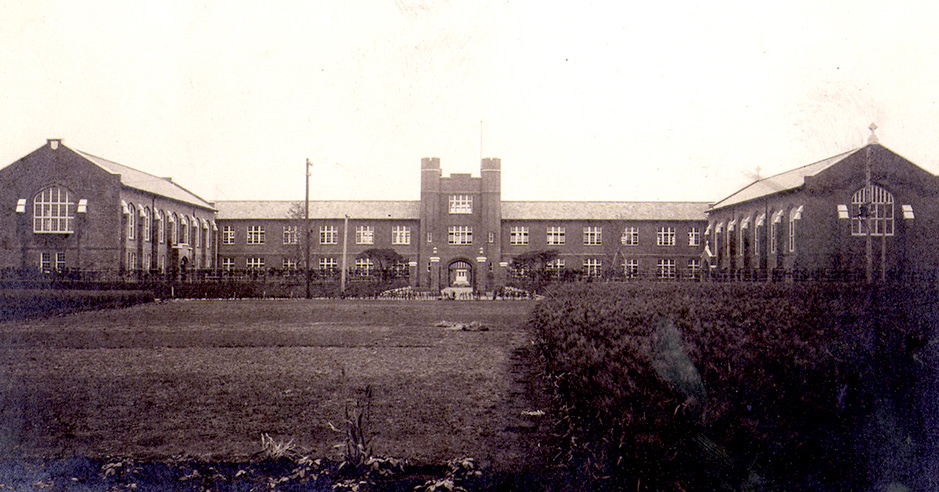
New Ikebukuro Campus main building, 1919

In 1909, 23 acres of land were purchased near Ikebukuro for the construction of a larger dedicated campus and the university moved into new buildings at this site in 1919. The University Chapel was consecrated in 1920, and the university was officially chartered by the Ministry of Education in 1922.

The original, red-brick, campus buildings, designed by Murphy & Dana Architects of New York, suffered structural damage in the 1923 Great Kantō earthquake but, due to the university's more suburban location, escaped the fires that destroyed much of the center of the city.

Until the 1920s almost all classes at Rikkyo were held in English; Japanese language textbooks were made more widely available toward the end of the decade.

In the late 1930s and during the Second World War Rikkyo's status as an Anglican Christian university came under severe pressure from the military authorities. In 1936, the president of the university, Shigeharu Kimura, was forced to resign over allegations of disrespect during a required public reading of the Imperial Rescript on Education in the University Chapel.

In September 1942, university trustees agreed to change the wording of the charter to sever all ties with Christianity. The majority of Christian faculty members lost their positions and the University All Saints Chapel was closed.

=== Post-war period ===
At the end of World War II in October 1945 the U.S. Occupation authorities moved swiftly to remove head officials associated with the teaching of militarism and the violation of the university's founding charter. The university re-established its links with the Anglican Church in Japan. With the support of former faculty such as Paul Rusch, they began to restart classes, re-hire faculty, and rebuild.

Women were admitted to degree programs in 1946.

A new library extension, designed by renowned Japanese architect Kenzo Tange, was completed in 1960.

With contributions from private donors, the Episcopal Church in the United States and the Japanese Ministry of Education, between 1961 and 2001 the university owned and operated a TRIGA 100 kW research reactor at Yokosuka, Kanagawa contributing the development of neutron radiography and energy research in Japan.

A second suburban campus in Niiza, Saitama for first- and second-year students was established in 1990.

Building on existing undergraduate study programs, new graduate schools for Business Administration, Social Design Studies, and Intercultural Communication were opened in 2002.

=== Recent developments ===
In September 2014, the Japanese Ministry of Education announced that Rikkyo University had been selected as a “Global Hub” university and will now receive special strategic government funding to support its global education programs.

== Organization ==
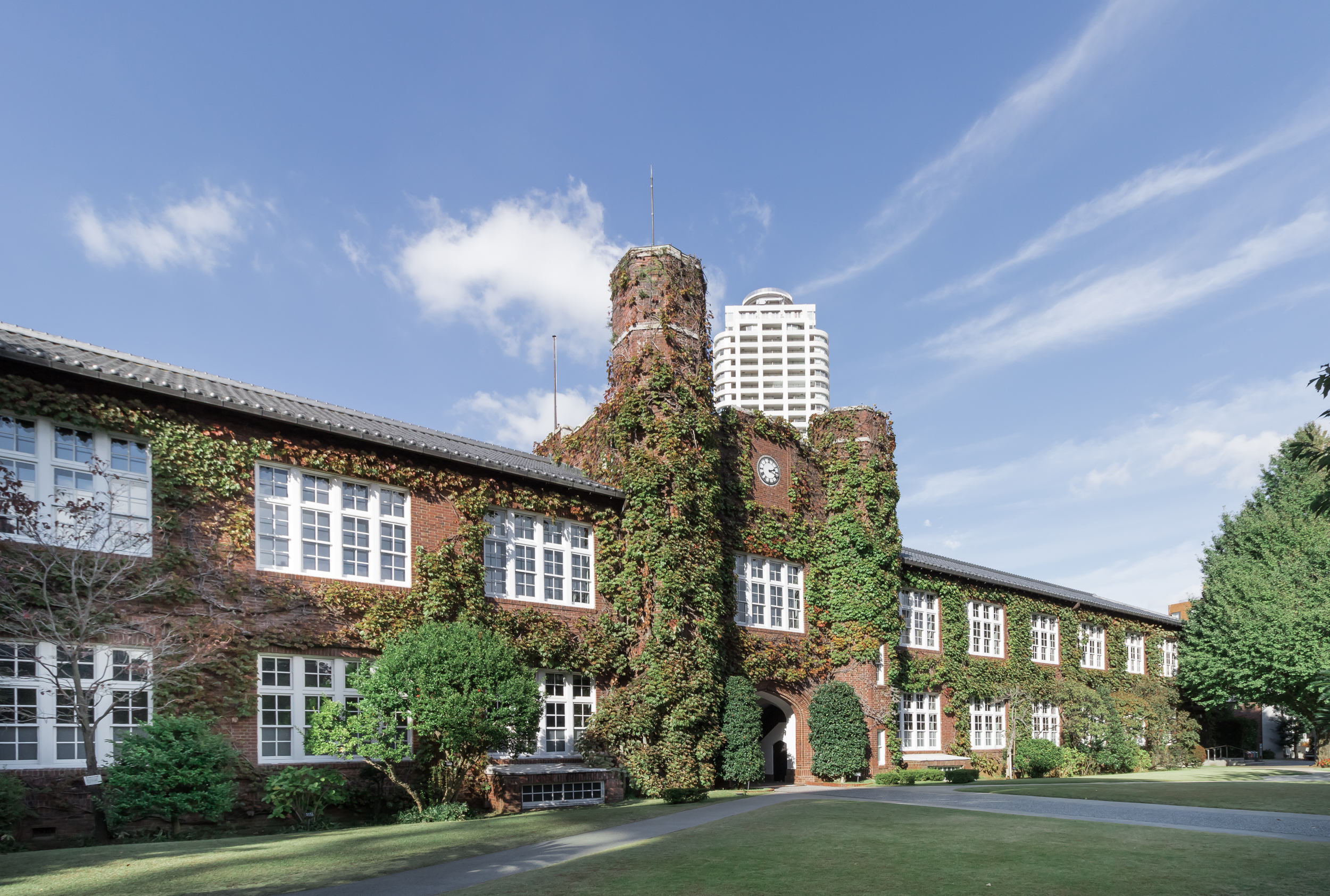
Rikkyo University, Main Building (No. 1), Ikebukuro Campus

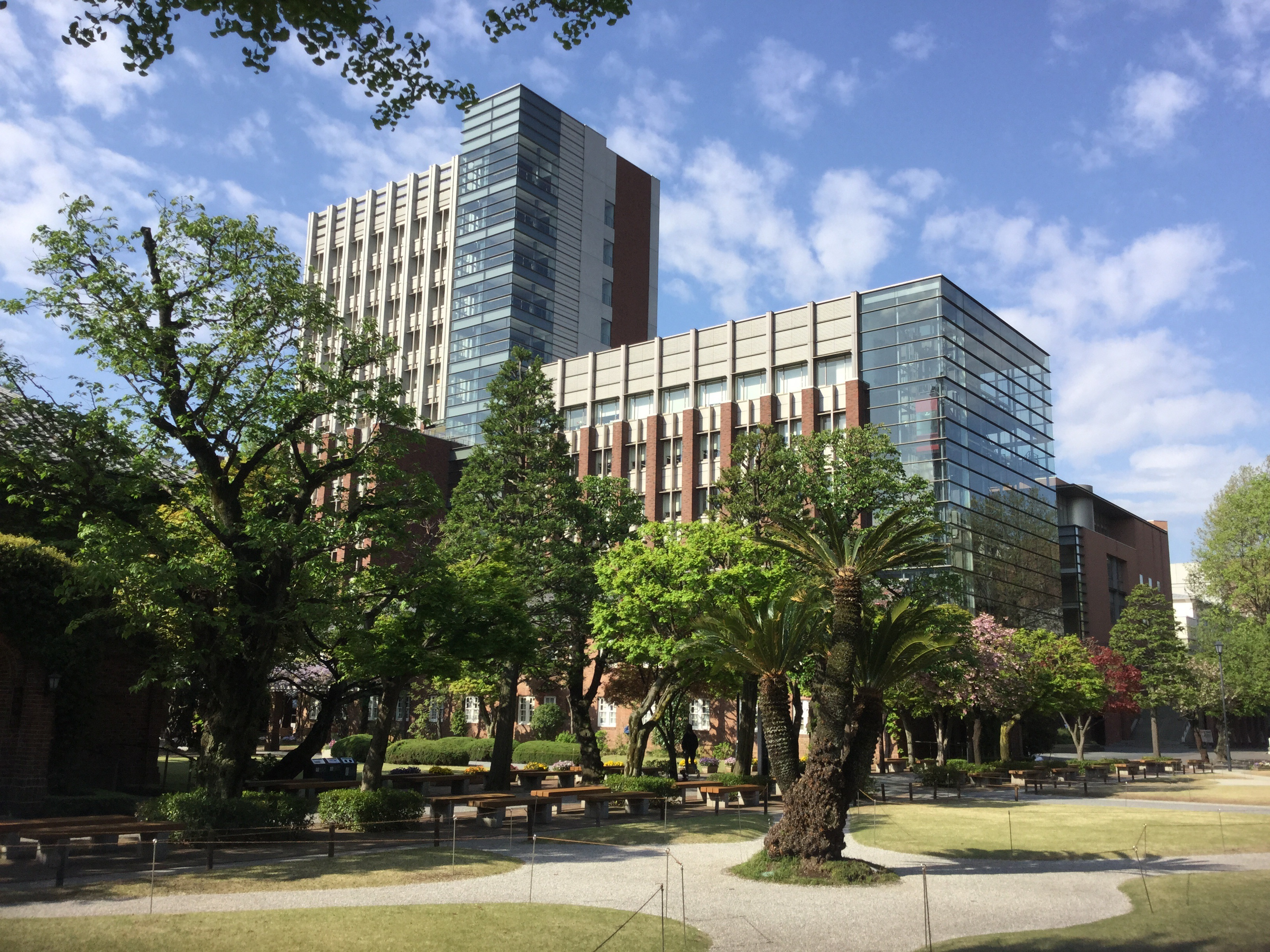
Rikkyo University, Buildings 11 and 15, Ikebukuro Campus

=== Undergraduate colleges ===
- College of Arts
- College of Intercultural Communications
- College of Economics
- College of Business
- College of Science
- College of Sociology
- College of Law and Politics
- College of Tourism
- College of Community and Human Service
- College of Contemporary Psychology
- College of Sports and Wellness
- Global Liberal Arts Program

=== Graduate schools ===
- Graduate School of Christian Studies
- Graduate School of Arts
- Graduate School of Intercultural Communication
- Graduate School of Economics
- Graduate School of Business
- Graduate School of Science
- Graduate School of Sociology
- Graduate School of Law and Politics
- Graduate School of Tourism
- Graduate School of Community and Human Service
- Graduate School of Contemporary Psychology
- Graduate School of Sport and Wellness
- Graduate School of Business Administration
- Graduate School of Social Design Studies
- Graduate School of Artificial Intelligence and Science

=== Research laboratories ===
==== Center for Interdisciplinary Research institutes ====
- Institute for American Studies
- Institute for Leadership Studies
- Centre for Asian Area Studies
- Japan Institute of Christian Education (JICE)
- Institute for Latin American Studies
- Institute of Social Welfare
- Institute of Tourism
- St. Paul's Institute of English Language Education
- Rikkyo Institute of Church Music
- Rikkyo Economics Research Institute
- Institute for Japanese Studies
- Rikkyo Wellness Institute
- Rikkyo Institute for Business Law Studies
- Rikkyo Institute for Legal Practice Studies
- Rikkyo Institute for Global Urban Studies

==== Other research institutes ====
- Rikkyo Institute for Peace and Community Studies
- Education for Sustainable Development Research institutes

== Library ==
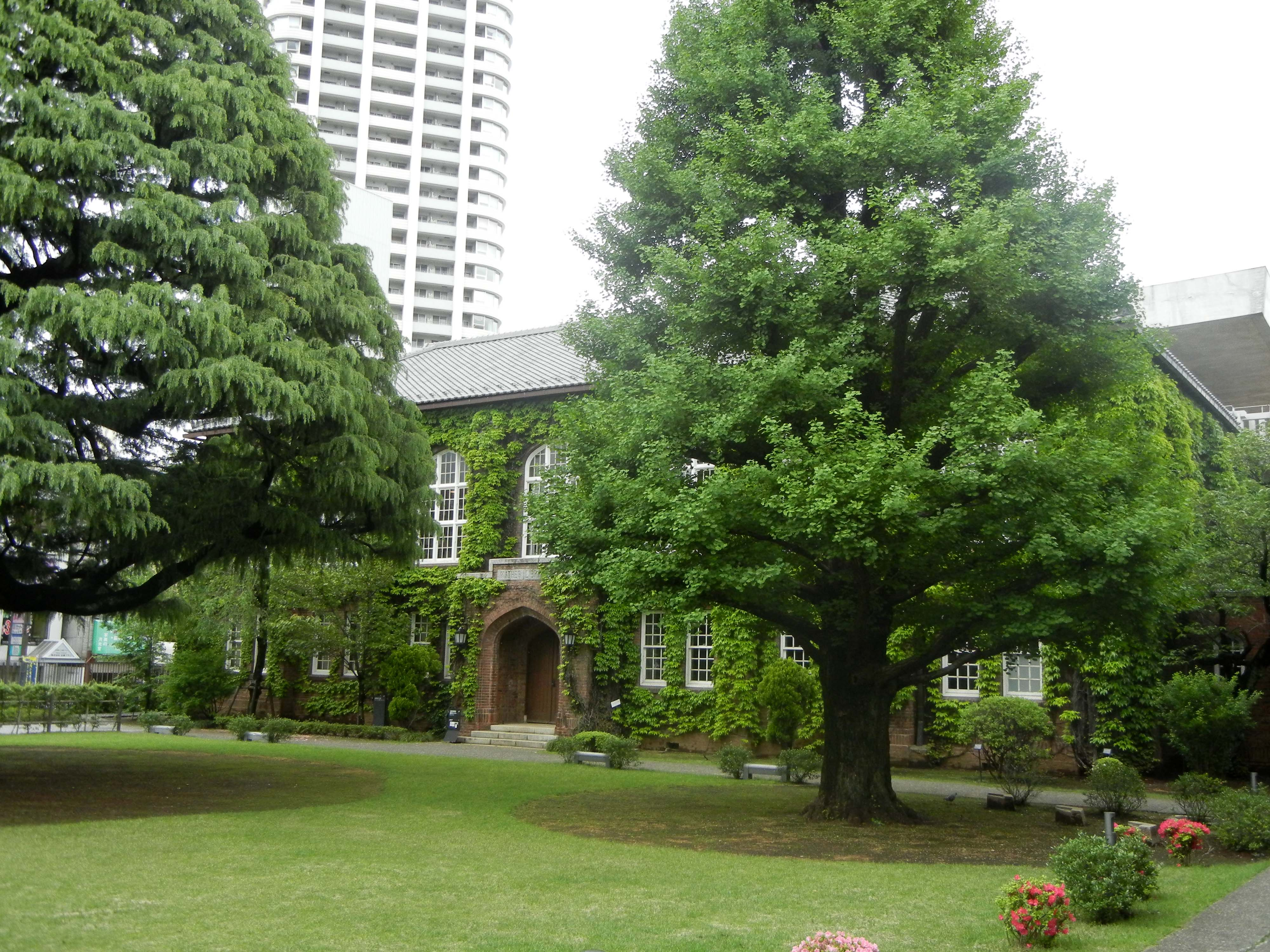
Ikebukuro Campus Mather Library

The Old Main Library, or Mather Library, in the group of historic red brick buildings at the university's main entrance, was built in 1918. The original building was named in memory of Samuel Livingston Mather II an American industrialist and long-time sponsor of Episcopal Church overseas mission work. Funds for the original building were donated by Mather in memory of his father. Further funding was also provided by him in 1925 to finance the repairs to the building in the wake of the 1923 Great Kanto earthquake.

The university library buildings have been expanded over succeeding decades to include landmark buildings by Kenzo Tange and more modern structures to house collections containing over 1.7 million volumes of print and non-print materials. The university libraries house specialist collections of the Protestant Episcopal Church and Edogawa Rampo.

=== Ikebukuro campus ===
- Main Library
- Social Sciences Library
- Humanities Library
- Natural Sciences Library
- Media Library

=== Niiza Campus ===
- Niiza Library
- Niiza Repository

== Students ==
Rikkyo is a co-educational university. As of 2009, female students outnumber male students overall; male students outnumber female students at the graduate level.

== Events ==
In common with most universities in Tokyo, Rikkyo holds an annual student-organized festival each autumn. Known as the St. Paul's festival, student clubs and societies provide entertainment, prepare food, organize sporting events and showcase academic work for the benefit of other students, prospective students, alumni, and the local community.

=== World Congress ===
- 2014 International Ornithological Congress

== Sports ==
Rikkyo's baseball team plays in the Tokyo Big6 Baseball League. They have won 13 league championships in their history.

Rikkyo's American football team plays in Japan's division one in the Kanto B conference. Their record was 3–4 in 2009.

Rikkyo fields a strong program in women's lacrosse.

== Alumni ==
- Jiro Akama: member of the House of Representatives (Liberal Democratic Party)
- Shinji Aoyama - Film director
- Tetsuma Esaki: member of House of Representatives (Liberal Democratic Party)
- Mineyuki Fukuda: member of the House of Representatives (the Liberal Democratic Party)
- Toshio Gotō - Film director
- Isuna Hasekura - Author
- Tomoko Honda - Television announcer
- Haruomi Hosono - Musician, member of the Yellow Magic Orchestra
- Ryō Ikebe - Actor
- Tadashi Inuzuka: member of the House of Councillors in the Diet (Democratic Party of Japan)
- Fukuzo Iwasaki: real estate entrepreneur
- Tsutomu Kawabuchi: member of the IIHF Hall of Fame
- Kiyoshi Kurosawa - Film director
- Monta Mino - Radio and television announcer
- Shinkichi Mitsumune - Composer
- Tatsuya Mori - Documentary filmmaker
- Yuka Murayama - Author
- Shigeo Nagashima - Baseball player and manager of the Yomiuri Giants
- Rei Nakanishi - Japanese novelist
- Yōko Nogiwa - Actress
- Toshio Ogawa: former Senior Vice-Minister of Justice (Japan), member of the House of Councillors in the Diet (Democratic Party of Japan)
- Akira Sakuma - Game producer
- Motoharu Sano - Songwriter, musician
- Makoto Shinozaki - Film director
- Akihiko Shiota - Film director
- Hiroshi Sugimoto - Photographer
- Masayuki Suo - Film director
- Kazuhito Tadano - Baseball player of the Hokkaido Nippon-Ham Fighters
- Taichi Takami - Professional shogi player, former Eiō title holder.
- Masami Tanabu: former Minister of Agriculture, Forestry and Fisheries (Japan)
- Ryosei Tanaka: member of the House of Representatives (Liberal Democratic Party)
- Yun Dong-ju - Poet
- Osamu Uno: member of the House of Representatives (Liberal Democratic Party)
- Asako Yuzuki - Author
- Zhou Zuoren - Chinese writer, the younger brother of Lu Xun (Zhou Shuren)
- Mafumafu - Singer-songwriter
- Saya Hiyama - Freelance announcer and former weather forecaster

== Recipients of honorary degrees ==
- Henry St. George Tucker (bishop) - the 19th Presiding Bishop of the Episcopal Church (1958)
- Arthur C. Lichtenberger - bishop of the Episcopal Church in the United States (1959)
- Milton Friedman - American economist (1963)
- Friedrich Hayek - economist and philosopher (1963)
- Paul Rusch - Anglican lay missionary to Japan, founder of Camp Seisen Ryo (1965)
- Arthur Frank Burns - American economist (1965)
- Edwin O. Reischauer - United States ambassador to Japan (1965)
- Joseph Kitagawa - dean of University of Chicago Divinity School(1977)
- Hanna Holborn Gray - president of the University of Chicago (1979)
- Robert Runcie - Archbishop of Canterbury (1987)
- Tom Foley - United States Ambassador to Japan (2000)
- Bill Gates - American business magnate (2000)
- Bob Hawke - Prime Minister of Australia (2003)
- Frank Griswold - 25th Presiding Bishop of the Episcopal Church (2005)
- Muhammad Yunus - founder of the Grameen Bank (2007)
- Rowan Williams - Archbishop of Canterbury (2009)
- Fazle Hasan Abed - Founder and Chairman of BRAC (NGO) (2009)

== International exchanges ==
- Australia
  - The Australian National University
  - Monash University
  - University of New South Wales
  - Murdoch University
- Bangladesh:
  - BRAC University
  - University of Dhaka
- Belgium: Katholieke Universiteit Leuven
- Canada
  - Saint Mary's University
  - St. Thomas University (Canada)
  - Université du Québec à Montréal
  - Université de Sherbrooke
  - University of Toronto, Faculty of Arts and Science
  - University of Waterloo
- China
  - Nankai University
  - Shanxi University
  - Chinese Academy of Social Sciences
  - East China Normal University
  - Jilin University
- Finland: University of Turku
- France
  - Jean Moulin University Lyon 3
  - Panthéon-Assas University
  - Institut national des langues et civilisations orientales
- Germany
  - Humboldt University
  - University of Tübingen
  - University of Bonn
  - University of Wuppertal
  - University of Marburg
- Hong Kong: The Chinese University of Hong Kong
- Indonesia: Universitas Padjadjaran
- Ireland: Dublin City University
- Liberia: Cuttington University
- Nepal: Tribhuvan University
- The Netherlands
  - Leiden University
  - Radboud University Nijmegen
- Norway
  - BI Norwegian Business School
  - Norwegian School of Economics
  - Volda University College
- Philippines
  - Ateneo de Manila University
  - Trinity University of Asia
- Poland: Warsaw University
- Singapore: National University of Singapore, Faculty of Arts and Social Sciences
- South Korea
  - Korea University
  - Yonsei University
  - Sungkonghoe University
  - Ewha Womans University
  - Sogang University
- Spain:
  - University of León
  - University of Seville
- Taiwan
  - Fu Jen Catholic University
  - National Chengchi University
- Thailand: Chulalongkorn University
- United Kingdom
  - University of Aberystwyth
  - University of Essex
  - University of Liverpool
  - University of Sheffield
- United States
  - Augustana College (Illinois)
  - The University of Chicago
  - Cornell University
  - Kent State University
  - Linfield College
  - University of Maryland
  - University of Missouri-St. Louis
  - San Diego State University
  - Vanderbilt University
  - University of Virginia
  - The University of the South
  - Western Michigan University

== See also ==
- Anglican Church in Japan
- Channing Moore Williams
- Naoki Monna, emeritus professor
