= 3rd Pacquiao-Elorde Awards =

3rd Pacquiao–Elorde Awards
- Date: April 30, 2026
- Location: Okada Manila, Parañaque
- Country: Philippines

Highlights
- Co–Boxers of the Year: Melvin Jerusalem; Pedro Taduran

The 3rd Pacquiao–Elorde Awards was an annual awarding ceremony giving recognition to the Filipino boxing champions and titlists from amateur and professional level, as well as personalities and organization involved in Philippine boxing and other sports personalities who made impact into Philippine sports.

The awards night, joinly organized by International Boxing Hall of Famer Manny Pacquiao and the family of the late legendary boxer Gabriel Elorde, was held last April 30, 2026 at Okada Manila in Parañaque City.

Before the awarding ceremony, a seven-fight card was hold with the Philippine Boxing Organization (PBO) super flyweight championship title bout between Giemel Magramo and Marco John Rementizo as its main event.

Philippine Sports Commission Chairman Patrick Gregorio, Games and Amusements Board Chairman Francisco Rivera and Former Senator Francis Tolentino were delivering speeches during the event and received their awards.

== See also ==
- 2026 PSA Annual Awards
- 40th SAC-SMB Cebu Sports Awards
- 2026 PSC Women in Sports Awards
