= 2025 in Philippine sports =

The following is a list of notable events and developments related to Philippine sports in 2025.

== Events ==
=== Athletics ===
- January 27 – John Chicano wins the gold and silver medals at the Jeddah Sprint Triathlon in Jeddah, Saudi Arabia.
- January 28 – Kristina Knott finishes in second place at the 60-meter event at the Martín Luther King Jr. Invitational in Albuquerque, New Mexico, United States after clocking in 7.34 seconds.
- January 29 – EJ Obiena finishes in second place at the International Jump Meeting Cottbus in Germany after clearing 5.65 meters.
- February 8 – EJ Obiena wins the gold medal at the Meeting Metz Moselle Athlelor in France after clearing 5.70 meters.
- February 16 – EJ Obiena wins the gold medal at the Copernicus Cup in Poland after clearing 5.80 meters.
- March 30 – EJ Obiena wins the gold medal at the Taiwan International Pole Vault Championship in Nantou, Taiwan, after clearing 5.50 meters.
- May 31 – EJ Obiena wins the gold medal at the men's pole vault event at the 2025 Asian Athletics Championships in South Korea after clearing 5.77 meters.
- June 22–25 – The Philippine delegation wins three silver and one bronze medals at the 2025 Thailand Open Track and Field Championships held in Pathum Thani, Thailand.
- July 29 – The Philippine Sports Commission opens its track and field facilities in Manila, Pasig, and Baguio for free to the public following a directive from President Bongbong Marcos during his fourth State of the Nation Address the previous day.
- August 2–3 – The Philippine delegation wins three silver and two bronze medals at the XXXIV Qosanov Memorial held in Almaty, Kazakhstan.
- September 7 – EJ Obiena wins the bronze medal at the World Athletics Continental Tour in Beijing, China, after clearing 5.65 meters.
- September 20–21 – The World Pole Vault Challenge is held at the Ayala Triangle Gardens in Makati, with EJ Obiena winning the gold medal after clearing 5.80 meters.
- October 4 – Sonny Wagdos and Joida Gagnao win the men's and women's open categories at the Kuala Lumpur Standard Chartered Marathon held in Kuala Lumpur, Malaysia.
- November 5–10 – The Philippine delegation finishes ninth overall at the 23rd Asia Masters Athletics Championships held in Chennai, India after winning five gold, five silver, and three bronze medals.
- November 15–18 – The Philippine delegation finishes third overall at the 17th Southeast Asian U18 and U20 Athletics Championships held in Medan, Indonesia after winning 11 gold, four silver, and one bronze medals.

=== Badminton ===
- October 1–5 – The Philippine delegation wins one silver, and one bronze medals at the 2025 North Harbour International held in New Zealand.

=== Basketball ===
- February 7 – The Samahang Basketbol ng Pilipinas ends its partnership with Nike Inc. in both the men's and women's national teams after 18 years as its official athletic sportswear.
- February 15–17 – The Philippines men's national team finishes third place at the 2025 Doha International Cup in Doha, Qatar with a 1–2 win-loss record.
- March 28 – TNT Tropang Giga wins the 2024–25 PBA Commissioner's Cup after defeating Barangay Ginebra San Miguel 4–3 in a do-or-die seven-game series at the Araneta Coliseum.
- April 2 – The Philippine Basketball Association unveils the 50 Greatest Players for its 50th anniversary.
- April 6 – Fil-Am Nation Select–USA wins the NBTC League National Champions Division I after defeating Phenom Blue Fire-Pasay 64–57 at the SM Mall of Asia Arena in Pasay.
- April 23 – The Pilipinas Aguilas win the inaugural WMPBL Invitational Tournament after defeating the UST Growling Tigresses 2–1 in a do-or-die three-game series at the Ninoy Aquino Stadium.
- May 9 – The Samahang Basketbol ng Pilipinas signs partnership with Adidas as its official athletic sportswear for both the men's and women's national teams.
- May 24–30 – The 2025 SEABA Under-16 Cup is held at Bren Z. Guiao Convention Center in San Fernando, Pampanga. The Philippines wins the gold medal after defeating Indonesia 70–40 in the final.
- May 30 – The men's and women's teams win the bronze and gold medals at the 2025 FIBA 3x3 Youth Nations League Asia-Pacific 1 in Doha, Qatar.
- July 12–20 – The Strong Group Athletics win the 2025 William Jones Cup in Taiwan.
- July 13–20 – The Philippines women's national basketball team finishes in sixth place at the 2025 FIBA Women's Asia Cup held in Shenzhen, China.
- July 19 – The NU Lady Bulldogs win the 11th Xiamen International Elite University Basketball Championship in Xiamen, China after defeating National Taiwan Normal University 60–58 in the final tournament.
- July 25 – The San Miguel Beermen win the 2025 PBA Philippine Cup after defeating TNT Tropang 5G 4–2 in a best-of-seven game series at the PhilSports Arena in Pasig.
- July 27 – The UP Fighting Maroons win the 2025 Filoil EcoOil Preseason Cup after defeating NU Bulldogs 79–65 in the final tournament.
- August 12 – The Maharlika Pilipinas Basketball League imposes a lifetime ban on GenSan Warriors player Michole Solera for punching Mindoro Tamaraws Jonas Tibayan during a match in Batangas City on August 11.
- August 5–17 – The Philippines men's national team finishes at seventh place at the 2025 FIBA Asia Cup in Jeddah, Saudi Arabia. They are eliminated by the defending champions Australia, losing to them 84–60 in the quarterfinals.
- August 24 – Stefanie Berberabe becomes the first female player to record a quadruple-double statistics in women's professional basketball history after making 20 points, 15 rebounds, 10 assists, and 10 steals.
- August 31 – September 7 – The Philippines men's national under-17 team finishes 10th place at the 2025 FIBA U16 Asia Cup in Ulaanbaatar, Mongolia.
- September 13–28 – The Philippines women's national team finishes sixth place at the 2025 FIBA U16 Women's Asia Cup held in Seremban, Malaysia after losing to Chinese Taipei 72–103 in fifth place classification match.
- October 28 – The Samahang Basketbol ng Pilipinas elects Ricky Vargas as its president.
- November 16 – The Batangas New Zealand Bluefire win the first professional Women's Maharlika Pilipinas Basketball League championship, after defeating Discovery Perlas Rizal 2–0 in a best-of-three series at Enderun Colleges in Taguig.
- December 13 – The San Beda Red Lions win the NCAA Season 101 basketball tournaments after defeating the Letran Knights 2–0 in a best-of-three game series at the Araneta Coliseum in Quezon City.
- December 14 – The UST Growling Tigresses win the UAAP Season 88 women's basketball title after defeating the NU Lady Bulldogs 2–1 in a do-or-die three-game series at the SM Mall of Asia Arena in Pasay.
- December 16 – The Abra Weavers win the 2025 MPBL finals after defeating the Quezon Huskers 3–0 in a best-of-five game series. The team has the most win-loss record in a single season of the MPBL with 38–1.
- December 17 – The De La Salle Green Archers win the UAAP Season 88 men's basketball title after defeating the UP Fighting Maroons 2–1 in a do-or-die three-game series at the Araneta Coliseum in Quezon City.

=== Bobsleigh ===
- February 27–28 – The Philippines women's bobsleigh team consisting of Rhea Joy Sumalpong and Shirley Salamagos wins the silver medal at the Korea Cup Bobsled Championship in Pyeongchang, South Korea after clocking in 55.07 seconds.

=== Boxing ===
- March 20 – The 2nd Pacquiao-Elorde Awards are held at Okada Manila in Parañaque, with Melvin Jerusalem and Pedro Taduran named as Boxers of the Year.
- March 30 – Melvin Jerusalem retains the WBC minimumweight championship after defeating Yudai Shigeoka via unanimous decision in Tokoname, Japan.
- April 27 – Marlon Tapales wins the vacant WBC International super bantamweight silver title after defeating Jon Jon Jet of Indonesia via referee stoppage in the third round held in General Santos.
- May 11 – Charly Suarez loses to Emanuel Navarrete via technical decision in the seventh round for the WBO super-featherweight title held in San Diego, California, United States. On June 2, the WBO overturns the decision and declares the result to be "no contest".
- May 24 – Pedro Taduran retains the IBF minimumweight championship after defeating Ginjiro Shigeoka via split decision in Osaka, Japan.
- June 8 – Manny Pacquiao is inducted to the International Boxing Hall of Fame in New York City, United States.
- June 14 – Nonito Donaire wins the WBA interim bantamweight championship after defeating Andrés Campos via unanimous decision in Buenos Aires, Argentina.
- July 6 – Jay Bryan Baricuatro wins the silver medal in the men's 50-kg category at the 2025 World Boxing Cup held in Astana, Kazakhstan, after losing to Sanzhar Tashkenbay of Kazakhstan with a score 27–30.
- July 20 – Manny Pacquiao ends his match against Mario Barrios in a majority draw to retain his opponent's WBC welterweight championship in Las Vegas, Nevada, United States. This is Pacquiao's first professional boxing match since his retirement in 2021.
- August 11 – The Philippine delegation wins two silver and two bronze medals at the Asian Boxing U22 and U19 Championships in Bangkok, Thailand.
- October 29 – The 50th Anniversary of Thrilla in Manila is held at the Araneta Coliseum.
- December 17 – Nonito Donaire loses the WBA interim bantamweight championship after being defeated by Seiya Tsutsumi via split decision in Tokyo, Japan.
- December 27 –
  - Kenneth Llover retains the OPBF bantamweight championship after defeating Ayati Sailike via knockout in Tokoname, Japan.
  - John Riel Casimero wins the OPBF super bantamweight championship after defeating Tom Mizokoshi via knockout in Tokoname, Japan.

=== Chess ===
- January 18 – National master Nika Juris Nicolas finishes second place at the Prague Open 2025 23rd International Chess Festival in the Czech Republic.
- April 19 – International master Paulo Bersamina wins 22nd Bangkok Chess Club Open in Bangkok, Thailand after defeating grandmaster Vitaliy Bernadskiy in the seventh round.
- May 15 – Grandmaster Daniel Quizon is included in this year's Forbes 30 Under 30 Asia list.
- June 26 – FIDE master Alekhine Nouri wins the gold and silver medals in rapid and blitz categories at the Asian Junior Chess Championship held in Sri Lanka, while national master Jerish John Velarde wins the bronze medal in rapid category at the same event.
- August 24 – Janelle Mae Frayna wins the women's blitz category at the Abu Dhabi International Chess Festival held in Abu Dhabi, United Arab Emirates after defeating Gulrukhbegim Tokhirjonova of Uzbekistan in the final tournament.
- September 14 – David Ray Sarmiento wins the men's rapid category at the 50th Anniversary Emden Chess Club Rapid Chess Championship held in Emden, Germany after scoring 6.0 points.
- September 16 – Amber Maravilla wins two medals in the 20th Malaysian Chess Festival held in Kuala Lumpur, Malaysia.
- October 15 – Jemicah Yap Mendoza wins the bronze medal at the women's under-14 division at the 2025 World Youth Chess Championship held in Durrës, Albania.
- November 9 – Ruelle Canino wins the silver medal at the women's division of the 6th ASEAN Individual Chess Championships held in Ozamiz, Misamis Occidental.

=== Cross country ===
- June 22 – Shagne Yaoyao wins the silver medal at the 2025 Coupe du Japon International Kyoto Yubune Stage in Wazuka, Japan.
- October 18–19 – The Philippine delegation emerges as the overall champions at the 2025 UCI Asia MTB Series final leg in Kumamoto, Japan.

=== Cue sports ===
- March 1 – Rubilen Amit wins the Women's Challenge of Champions held at Rio in Las Vegas, Nevada, United States after defeating Kristina Tkach of Russia 6–3 in the final tournament.
- March 9 – The Asian Confederation of Billiards Sports suspends the Billiards Sports Confederation of the Philippines, citing multiple violations including "conflicts of interest, failure to hold elections for a long time, and organizing international tournaments without the necessary approvals".
- April 27 – Anton Raga wins the inaugural 2025 SBA Philippine Open after defeating Jerico Bañares 13–6 in the final tournament.
- July 6 – Alexis Ferrer wins the 2025 Universal CPBA 99 Open after defeating defending champion Chang Yu-lung of Chinese Taipei 13–10 in the final tournament.
- July 7 – Chezka Centeno finishes as runner-up at the 2025 WPA Women’s 8-Ball World Championship after losing to Jasmin Ouschan of Austria 8–9 in the final tournament held in Green Bay, Wisconsin, United States.
- July 19 – Jeff de Luna and Chezka Centeno win the 2025 Indonesia International Mixed Doubles 10-Ball Open, defeating Denis Grabe and Pia Filler in straight sets, 2–0, in a best-of-three final tournament.
- July 22 – Chezka Centeno wins the M Arena Ladies Open in Jakarta, Indonesia after defeating fellow Filipino Denden Santos 10–6 in the final tournament.
- July 27 – Carlo Biado wins the 2025 WPA World Nine-ball Championship in Jeddah, Saudi Arabia after defeating Fedor Gorst 15–13 in the final tournament.
- August 3 – Lee Vann Corteza wins the Rally in the Shenandoah Valley tournament in Front Royal, Virginia, United States after defeating Yannick Pongers 15–14 in the final tournament.
- August 13 – Chezka Centeno wins the silver medal at the women's 10-ball finals of the 2025 World Games in Chengdu, China after losing to Han Yu of China 6–7.
- August 30 – Paolo Gallito wins the inaugural Efren "Bata" Reyes Yalin 10-Ball Championship held in Mandaluyong after defeating Lee Vann Corteza 13–12 in the final tournament.
- September 26 – Rubilen Amit finishes runner-up at the Saigon Women’s 9-Ball Open held in Ho Chi Minh City, Vietnam after losing to Wei Tzu Chien of Chinese Taipei 1–2 in a best-of-three final game series.
- October 12 – Chezka Centeno wins the 2025 WPA World Women's Ten-ball Championship held in Bali, Indonesia after defeating fellow Filipino Rubilen Amit 3–2 in a best-of-five final series.
- October 16–19 – The second edition of the Reyes Cup is held at the Ninoy Aquino Stadium in Manila. The tournament concludes with Team Asia winning with a score of 11–3 against Team Rest of the World.
- October 21–25 – The inaugural edition of the Philippines Cup is held at Gateway Mall in Quezon City. The tournament concludes with David Alcaide of Spain winning the final against Arseni Sevastyanov of Finland 11–3.
- November 2– Jonas Magpantay wins the Qatar 10-Ball World Cup held in Doha, Qatar after defeating Szymon Kural of Poland 13–9 in the final tournament.
- November 9 – Genesis Ouano wins the Bojue International 9-Ball Open held in Jakarta, Indonesia after defeating James Aranas 9–8 in an all-Filipino final tournament.
- November 23 – Kyle Amoroto wins the All Japan Championship held in Osaka, Japan after defeating Johann Chua 11–5 in an all-Filipino final tournament.
- December 5 – AJ Manas wins the WWW Open held in Jakarta, Indonesia after defeating William Johan 11–7 in the final tournament.

=== Curling ===
- February 14 – The Philippine men's national team, composed of Marc Pfister, Christian Haller, Enrico Pfister, Alan Frei, and Benjo Delarmente, wins the gold medal at the men's curling tournament at the 2025 Asian Winter Games in Harbin, China. It is also the Philippines's (and Southeast Asia's) first gold medal at the Asian Winter Games.

=== Cycling ===
- January 14–15 – The Philippine cycling team wins one gold, two silver, and one bronze medal at the 2025 UCI Thai MTB XCO Cup in Thailand.
- February 8 – Mark Galedo wins the silver medal at the Masters 40-44 age category of individual time trial at the Asian Cycling Confederation Road Championships in Thailand.
- March 7–11 – The Philippine women's cycling team finishes fifth overall at the Biwase Tour of Vietnam in Bình Dương, Vietnam
- April 24–May 1 – The Tour de Luzon is held beginning in Laoag, Ilocos Norte and finishing at Camp John Hay in Baguio.

=== Darts ===
- February 16 – Christian Perez wins the 2025 Scottish Open after defeating Ryan Hogarth of Scotland 5–3 in the men's singles final tournament.
- March 9 – Christian Perez wins the 2025 Isle of Man Open after defeating Carl Wilkinson of England 5–2 in the open men's singles final tournament.
- September 28 – Lourence Ilagan wins the 2025 WDF Korea Open after defeating Raymond Smith 6–4 in the final tournament.
- September 30 – Lovely Mae Orbeta wins the Women Singles finals of the 2025 WDF World Cup in Gyeonggi, South Korea after defeating Irina Armstrong 6–2.

=== Diving ===
- April 11–13 – The Red Bull Cliff Diving World Series opens its 2025 season in El Nido, Palawan.

=== Equestrian ===
- July 19 – Toni Leviste wins the FEI Prix St. Georges in Belgium with a score of 68.603 percent, becoming the first Filipino equestrian to win an international dressage event in Europe.

=== Fencing ===
- July 20–24 – The Philippine delegation wins four gold, two silver, and seven bronze medals at the Southeast Asian Fencing Federation Junior Championship 2025 in Kuala Lumpur, Malaysia.

=== Figure skating ===
- January 16–18 – The Philippines participates in the 2025 Winter World University Games in Turin, Italy, with its lone representative, Skye Chua, finishing in 32nd place in the women's singles figure skating event.
- August 1–5 – The Asian Open Figure Skating Trophy is held at the SM Skating Rink of the SM Mall of Asia in Pasay.
- November 6–8 – The Philippine Figure Skating Championships is held at the SM Skating Rink of the SM Mall of Asia in Pasay.

=== Football ===
- January 19 – The Philippines women's national futsal team qualifies for the 2025 AFC Women's Futsal Asian Cup, its first participation in an AFC Women's Futsal Asian Cup tournament. They fail to advance to the knockout stage after finishing last in their group.
- April 13 – The Kaya F.C.–Iloilo emerges as winner of 2024–25 PFL season.
- May 7–18 – The Philippines national team participates in the 2025 AFC Women's Futsal Asian Cup in Hohhot, China. They fail to advance to the knockout stage after finishing last in their group.
- May 31 – Albert Capellas resigns as the head coach of the Philippines men's national football team.
- June 17 – Freddy González steps down as the team manager of the Philippines men's national football team.
- July 13 – The Philippine under-16 team wins the Lion City Cup in Singapore after defeating Cambodia 3–1 in the final at the Jalan Besar Stadium, marking the Philippine team's first international title.
- July 19 – Makati F.C. wins the Girls 13 division of the Gothia World Youth Cup in Sweden after defeating the San Francisco Seals 6–0 in the final in Gothenburg.
- July 24 – Carles Cuadrat and Miguel Gutierrez are appointed as the respective head coach and manager of the Philippines men's national football team.
- August 7–13 – The Philippines national team participates in the 2025 ASEAN Women's Championship in Haiphong, Vietnam. They fail to defend their 2022 title after finishing their group in third place (only the top two teams per group advance to the knockout stage).
- November 21–December 7 – The inaugural edition of the FIFA Futsal Women's World Cup is held at the PhilSports Arena in Pasig. The tournament concludes with Brazil defeating Portugal 3–0 in the final.

=== Golf ===
- March 23 – Aidric Chan wins the Lexus Challenge of the Asian Development Tour in Vietnam.
- August 2 – Seven-year old Zach Guico wins the Boys Under-7 division of US Kids World Championships in Pinehurst, North Carolina, United States after scoring 2-over-par 38 points.
- October 23–26 – The International Series Philippines is held at the Sta. Elena Golf Club in Santa Rosa, Laguna. It concludes with Miguel Tabuena winning the tournament.

=== Gymnastics ===
- June 5 – Carlos Yulo wins the bronze medal in all-around exercises at the 2025 Asian Men's Artistic Gymnastics Championships in South Korea after obtaining 83.633 points.
- June 7 – Carlos Yulo wins the gold medal in floor exercise apparatus at the 2025 Asian Men's Artistic Gymnastics Championships in South Korea after obtaining 14.600 points.
- June 8:
  - Carlos Yulo wins the bronze medals in vault and parallel bars exercises at the 2025 Asian Men's Artistic Gymnastics Championships in South Korea after obtaining 14.133 and 14.166 points respectively.
  - Eldrew Yulo wins the silver medal in junior vault exercise at the 2025 Asian Men's Artistic Gymnastics Championships in South Korea after obtaining 13.850 points.
- October 19–25 – The eight-strong Philippine delegation participates at the 2025 World Artistic Gymnastics Championships in Jakarta, Indonesia.
  - October 24 – Carlos Yulo wins the bronze medal in floor exercise after obtaining 14.533 points.
  - October 25 – Carlos Yulo wins the gold medal in men’s vault after obtaining 14.866 points.
- November 20–24 – The 2025 Junior World Artistic Gymnastics Championships is held at the Marriott Grand Ballroom in Pasay.
  - Eldrew Yulo wins the bronze medal in floor exercise after obtaining 13.733 points.
  - Eldrew Yulo wins the bronze medal in horizontal bar after obtaining 14.000 points.

=== Handball ===
- February 3–12 – The Philippine men's and women's teams win the gold and bronze medals, respectively at the 2025 Southeast Asian Beach Handball Championship in Suphan Buri, Thailand.
- May 6–15 – The Philippines women's national beach handball team wins the silver medal at the 2025 Asian Beach Handball Championship in Oman after losing to Vietnam 16–22 in the final tournament.

=== Ice hockey ===
- June 6 – The Philippines women's national ice hockey team wins the gold medal at the 2025 IIHF Women's Asia Cup in Al-Ain, United Arab Emirates.

=== Jiu-jitsu ===
- February 13–19 – The Philippine delegation wins two gold, two silver, and five bronze medals at the 2nd Jiu-Jitsu Asian Youth Championship in Bangkok, Thailand.
- June 19–22 – The Philippine delegation wins two medals at the 2025 Asian Jiu-Jitsu Championships held in Chiba, Japan.
- August 10 – Kaila Napolis wins the silver medal at the jiu-jitsu ne-waza 52kg women's finals of the 2025 World Games in Chengdu, China after losing to Eon Ju Im of South Korea.

=== Kickboxing ===
- April 7–12 – The Philippine delegation wins eight gold, four silver, and 10 bronze medals at the First Thailand Kickboxing World Cup in Bangkok, Thailand.

=== Lacrosse ===
- January 6–11 – The Philippines women's national team wins the bronze medal at the 2025 Asia-Pacific Women's Lacrosse Championship in Sunshine Coast, Queensland, Australia after defeating Chinese Taipei with a score 18–6. The team qualifies for the 2026 World Lacrosse Women's World Championship in Japan.

=== Mixed martial arts ===
- January 11 – Denice Zamboanga wins the interim ONE Women's Atomweight World Championship in Bangkok, Thailand, after defeating Ukraine's Alyona Rassohyna via technical knockout.
- February 20 – Joshua Pacio retains the undisputed ONE Strawweight World Championship title after defeating Jarred Brooks via technical knockout on the second round at ONE 171 held at Lusail Sports Arena in Qatar.
- May 2 – Denice Zamboanga unifies the ONE Women's Atomweight World Championship after super-champion Stamp Fairtex relinquishes the title.

=== Motorsports ===
- September 22 – Iñigo Anton becomes the first Filipino to win at the Formula 4 after the rookie category tallying 296 points at the 2025 Formula 4 South East Asia Championship.
- September 28 – The Philippine delegation finishes first overall at the 2025 FIA APAC Motorsport Championship held in Sri Lanka after winning two gold, two silver, and three gold medals.

=== Muay Thai ===
- May 31 – The Philippine delegation wins five gold, two silver, and four bronze medals at the 2025 IFMA World Senior Muaythai Championships in Antalya, Turkey.
- June 22–26 – The Philippine delegation wins five gold, three silver, and two bronze medals at the 2025 Asian Muaythai Championships held in Thái Nguyên, Vietnam.
- September 22–28 – The Philippine delegation wins seven gold, seven silver, and one bronze medals at the 2025 IFMA Youth World Championships held in Abu Dhabi, United Arab Emirates.

=== Padel ===
- August 31 – The Philippine delegation wins the Asia Pacific Padel Cup 2025 held in Malaysia after defeating Hong Kong 3–0 in the final tournament.

=== Pickleball ===
- March 11 – Anna Clarice Patrimonio wins the gold medal at the 2025 WPC Series – Asia Pickleball Open in Pattaya, Thailand after defeating Mihika Yadav of India 21–17 in the final tournament.
- August 14 – The Philippine delegation wins the men's, women's, and mixed doubles at the inaugural Pickleball Champions League in Shenzhen, China.
- November 9 – The Philippine delegation wins three gold, one silver, and two bronze medals at the 2025 Pickleball World Cup held in Fort Lauderdale, Florida, United States.

=== Poomsae ===
- October 23:
  - Kristen Aguila wins the silver medal in the girls’ individual recognized category at the 2025 Asian Youth Games in Bahrain after losing to Zeinab Shahriari of Iran.
  - Aeden Cereño wins the bronze medal in the boys’ individual freestyle category at the 2025 Asian Youth Games in Bahrain.

=== Rugby ===
- July 12 – The Philippines national rugby union team wins the gold medal at the 2025 Union Cup held in Kaoshiung, Taiwan after defeating Thailand 23–6 in the final tournament.

=== Sambo ===
- March 9 – The Philippine delegation wins two gold, one silver, and one bronze medal at the 2024 Dutch Sambo Open in Dalfsen, Netherlands.
- April 5 – The Philippine delegation wins three gold, and one silver medals at the 2025 US Sambo International in Atlanta, Georgia, United States.
- August 14 – Aislinn Yap wins the bronze medal at the women's sambo combat -80kg category of the 2025 World Games in Chengdu, China after defeating Nicole Castro of Costa Rica 3-1.

=== Shooting ===
- September 21–28 – The Philippine delegation wins two gold, four silver, and two bronze medals at the 2025 IPSC Handgun World Shoot held in Matlosana, South Africa.

=== Skateboarding ===
- May 24 – Margielyn Didal wins the bronze medal at the women's division of Street League Skateboarding in Santa Monica, California, United States.
- November 1–2 – Mazel Paris Alegado wins the gold medal at the women's division of the 2025 Exposure Skate Women’s Bowl Open Pro Finals held in Encinitas, California, United States.

=== Squash ===
- May 9–12 – The Philippine delegation wins one gold, two silver, and two bronze medals at the 2025 Southeast Asia Junior Championships held in Bangkok, Thailand.
- November 9 – Jemyca Aribado wins the gold medal at the women's single category of the Marigold-SGCC Singapore Challenger held in Singapore after defeating Malak Samir of Egypt in three sets (11–9, 12–10, 11–8).

=== Swimming ===
- June 25–27 – The Philippine delegation wins one gold, two silver, and two bronze medals at the 47th Southeast Asia Age Group Aquatics Championships held in Singapore.
- August 1–2 – The Philippine delegation wins three bronze medals at the Pan Asia 21st Hong Kong Artistic Swimming Open Championships in Hong Kong.

=== Table tennis ===
- April 17–22 – The Philippine delegation wins four bronze medals at the 2025 Southeast Asian Regional Youth Championships in Jakarta, Indonesia.

=== Tennis ===
- March 21 – Alexandra Eala becomes the first Filipina tennis player to defeat a WTA top-30 opponent after beating the world No. 25, Jeļena Ostapenko of Latvia, 7–6(2), 7–5, in the second round of the 2025 Miami Open – Women's singles tournament in Miami, Florida, United States. Eala also becomes the first Filipino to beat a former Grand Slam champion at a WTA-level event, as Ostapenko previously won the 2017 French Open – Women's singles.
- March 23 – Alexandra Eala becomes the first Filipino to defeat a top-10 opponent (in the Open Era) after beating the world No. 5, Madison Keys of the United States, 6–4, 6–2, in the third round of the 2025 Miami Open – Women's singles tournament.
- March 26 – Alexandra Eala becomes the first Filipina to reach the semifinals of a WTA Tour event after beating the world No. 2, Iga Świątek of Poland, 6–2, 7–5, in the quarterfinals of the 2025 Miami Open – Women's singles tournament. With this win, Eala also becomes the first Filipina to make her debut in the top 100 of the WTA rankings.
- June 27 – Alexandra Eala becomes the first Filipina to reach the finals of a WTA Tour event after beating Varvara Gracheva of Russia, 7–5, 2–6, 6–3, in the semifinals of the 2025 Eastbourne Open – Women's singles tournament.
- June 28 – Alexandra Eala finishes as runner-up of the 2025 Eastbourne Open – Women's singles tournament after losing to Maya Joint of Australia, 6–4, 1–6, 7–6^{(12–10)}, in the final. Nonetheless, it is the highest finish by a Filipina player at a WTA Tour event.
- July 4–9 – The Philippine delegation wins one gold, four silver, and three bronze medals at the 18th Poland Cup International Soft Tennis Tournament held in Grodzisk Mazowiecki, Poland.
- August 24 – Alexandra Eala becomes the first Filipino to win a main draw match at a Grand Slam tournament in the Open Era after beating Clara Tauson of Denmark, 6–3, 2–6, 7–6^{(13–11)}, in the first round of the 2025 US Open – Women's singles tournament.
- September 6 – Alexandra Eala becomes the first Filipino to win a WTA tournament after beating Panna Udvardy of Hungary, 1–6, 7–5, 6–3, in the final of the 2025 Guadalajara 125 Open – Singles tournament.
- November 3 – Alexandra Eala, ranked 50th, becomes the first Filipina to debut in the top 50 of the WTA rankings.

=== Teqball ===
- October 23 – Nicole Tabucol and Crystal Cariño win the bronze medal in women's teqball at the 2025 Asian Youth Games in Bahrain after defeating Rawan Abdulaziz and Fatima Albanna of Bahrain 2-1.

=== Trail running ===
- August 3 – Two contestants die from suspected heat-related illness while participating in the Balikadaw X Santo Tomas Mountain Trail in Santo Tomas, Davao del Norte.

=== Triathlon ===
- April 6 – Diego Dimayuga wins the silver medal in the 13–15 age category at the 2025 Asia Triathlon Sprint Championship in Hong Kong.
- June 15 – John Patrick Ciron wins the Ironman 70.3 held in Subic Bay after clocking in 4 hours, 37 minutes, and 28 seconds.
- August 16 – Kira Ellis wins the Europe Triathlon Junior Cup in Riga, Latvia.

=== Volleyball ===
- April 2–5 – The 2025 Asian Beach Volleyball Nuvali Open is held in Santa Rosa, Laguna.
- April 6 – The Cignal HD Spikers win the 2025 Spikers' Turf Open Conference after defeating the Criss Cross King Crunchers 2–1 in a do-or-die three-game series at the PhilSports Arena in Pasig.
- April 12 – The Petro Gazz Angels win the 2024–25 Premier Volleyball League All-Filipino Conference title after defeating the Creamline Cool Smashers 2–1 in a do-or-die three-game series at the PhilSports Arena in Pasig.
- April 20–27 – The 2025 AVC Women's Champions League is held in Metro Manila.
- May 14 – The NU Lady Bulldogs win the UAAP Season 87 women's volleyball championship title after defeating the De La Salle Lady Spikers 2–0 in a best-of-three game series at the SM Mall of Asia Arena in Pasay.
- May 17 – The NU Bulldogs win the UAAP Season 87 men's volleyball championship title after defeating the FEU Tamaraws 3–0 in a best-of-three game series at the SM Mall of Asia Arena in Pasay.
- June 7–14 – The Philippines women's national volleyball team participates at the 2025 AVC Women's Volleyball Nations Cup in Hanoi, Vietnam. The team wins the silver medal after losing 3–0 to Vietnam in the final, marking the best finish by the Philippines in an Asian volleyball tournament since 1961.
- June 9 – The UE Lady Red Warriors volleyball team is disbanded due to a lack of sponsors.
- June 11:
  - The Arellano Chiefs win the NCAA Season 100 men's volleyball championship title after defeating the Letran Knights 2–0 in a best-of-three finals series at the Playtime Filoil Centre in San Juan, Metro Manila. It is also the team's first victory in the NCAA volleyball championships since they joined the league in 2009.
  - The Benilde Lady Blazers win the NCAA Season 100 women's volleyball championship title after defeating the Letran Lady Knights 2–0 in a best-of-three finals series at the Playtime Filoil Centre in San Juan, Metro Manila.
- June 17–24 – The Philippines men's national volleyball team finishes in 10th place at the 2025 AVC Men's Volleyball Nations Cup in Manama, Bahrain.
- June 28–July 5 – The Philippines women's national volleyball team finishes in fourth place at the 2025 VTV International Women's Volleyball Cup in Phú Thọ, Vietnam.
- July 9–13 – The Philippine leg of the 2025 SEA Men's V.League is held in Candon, Ilocos Sur.
- August 3 – The Philippines women's national volleyball team wins the bronze medal at the first leg of the 2025 SEA Women's V.League in Nakhon Ratchasima, Thailand after defeating Indonesia 3–1.
- August 10 – The Philippines women's national volleyball team wins the bronze medal at the second leg of the 2025 SEA Women's V.League in Ninh Binh, Vietnam after defeating Indonesia 3–0.
- August 17 – The PLDT High Speed Hitters win the 2025 Premier Volleyball League on Tour after defeating the Chery Tiggo Crossovers 3–2 at the SM Mall of Asia Arena in Pasay. This is their first title in the history of the PVL.
- August 31 – The PLDT High Speed Hitters win the 2025 Premier Volleyball League Invitational Conference after defeating Kobe Shinwa University 3–1 at the Araneta Coliseum in Quezon City. This is their first back-to-back championship, making them the first team to become undefeated in two conferences.
- September 4 – National University retires the No. 4 jersey of former NU Lady Bulldogs player Bella Belen, making her the third player in the history of the UAAP women's volleyball championships to have her jersey retired by her home school.
- September 12–28 – The 21st FIVB Volleyball Men's World Championship is held in Metro Manila. The tournament concludes with Italy winning the final against Bulgaria in four sets (25-21, 25-17, 17-25, 25-10).
- November 1–8 – The Philippines women's national team finishes in fifth place at the 2025 Asian Women's U16 Volleyball Championship in Amman, Jordan after defeating Thailand in four sets (25–23, 25–20, 19–25, 25–22). The team qualifies for the 2026 FIVB Volleyball Girls' U17 World Championship.
- November 21 – The Philippine National Volleyball Federation elects Anthony Liao as its president replacing Ramon Suzara.
- November 29 – The Criss Cross King Crunchers wins the 2025 Spikers' Turf Invitational Conference after defeating guest team Kindai University of Japan in five sets (25–15, 25–21, 23–25, 23–25, 22–20).
- November 30 – The Petro Gazz Angels win the 2025 Premier Volleyball League Reinforced Conference title after defeating the Zus Coffee Thunderbelles 3–1 at the Araneta Coliseum in Quezon City. This is also their 2nd championship title in 1 season.
- December 2 – The Chery Tiggo Crossovers announce their disbandment after 11 years.

=== Vovinam ===
- November 7 – The Philippine delegation wins one silver, and five bronze medals at the Vovinam World Championships held in Bali, Indonesia.

=== Water polo ===
- April 23 – The Philippines men's national under-21 water polo team wins a bronze medal at the 60th Malaysia Invitational Age-Group Water Polo Championships in Kuala Lumpur, Malaysia.

=== Weightlifting ===
- April 30 – The Philippine delegation wins ten gold, three silver, and three bronze medals at the IWF World Youth & Junior Championships in Lima, Peru.
- May 9–15 – The Philippine delegation finishes 11th overall at the 2025 Asian Weightlifting Championships in Jiangshan, China after winning seven silver and three bronze medals.
- August 4 – The International Testing Agency issues a two-year competition ban on Vanessa Sarno for failing to report her daily whereabouts for drug-testing purposes. Sarno's condition is attributed by Samahang Weightlifting ng Pilipinas president Monico Puentevella to her pregnancy.
- October 6 – Elreen Ando wins the bronze medal at the 2025 World Weightlifting Championships in Førde, Norway after lifting a total of 231 kg (509 lb) in the women's 63kg weight class.
- October 28 – The International Testing Agency issues a two-year competition ban on John Ceniza for anti-doping offenses.

=== Wushu ===
- April 5–10 – The Philippine delegation wins one gold, and two bronze medals at the 10th Sanda World Cup in Jiangyin, China.
- August 12 – Carlos Baylon, Jr. wins the bronze medal at the men’s wushu sanda 56kg of the 2025 World Games in Chengdu, China after defeating Islam Karimov of Kazakhstan.
- September 1–8 – The Philippine delegation wins one silver and six bronze medals at the 2025 World Wushu Championships in Brasília, Brazil.

=== Multi-sport events ===
- January 22 – President Bongbong Marcos vetoes a bill that would have institutionalized and expanded the Philippine National Games, citing possible duplication with other aspects of the national sports program.
- January 27 – The 2025 PSA Annual Awards are held at the Manila Hotel in Manila, with gymnast Carlos Yulo named as Athlete of the Year.
- February 7–14 – The 20-strong Philippine delegation finishes fifth place overall at the 2025 Asian Winter Games in Harbin, China, after winning one gold medal.
- March 11–13 – The Philippine delegation wins five gold, six silver, and four bronze medals at the 2025 World Para Athletics Grand Prix in New Delhi, India.
- March 15 – The 2025 PSC Women in Sports Awards is held at Century Park Hotel in Manila, with boxers and 2024 Summer Olympics medalists Nesthy Petecio and Aira Villegas named as Athletes of the Year.
- May 5 – The International Olympic Committee (IOC) appoints Mikee Cojuangco-Jaworski as the chairperson of IOC Coordination Commission for the 2032 Summer Olympics.
- May 24–31– The 65th edition of the Palarong Pambansa is held in Laoag, Ilocos Norte. The National Capital Region emerges as the winner in the overall medal tally with 117 gold, 70 silver, and 50 bronze medals.
- June 28 – Former Philippine Basketball Association chairman Patrick Gregorio is appointed as chairman of the Philippine Sports Commission, replacing Dickie Bachmann.
- August 7–17 – The Philippine delegation wins two silver and two bronze medals at the 2025 World Games in Chengdu, China.
- August 20–26 – The Philippine delegation finishes 2nd overall at the 2nd Southeast Asian Deaf Games held in Jakarta, Indonesia after winning seven gold, six silver, and 12 bronze medals.
- October 22–31 – The 141-strong Philippine delegation finishes 12th overall at the 2025 Asian Youth Games in Bahrain after winning seven gold, seven silver, and ten bronze medals.
- October 25–31 – The 16th edition of Batang Pinoy is held in General Santos. The city of Pasig emerges as the winner in the overall medal tally with 95 gold, 72 silver, and 87 bronze medals.
- November 20–28 – The Philippine delegation finishes 4th overall at the 2025 ASEAN School Games in Brunei after winning 11 gold, 10 silver, and 22 bronze medals.
- December 5 – The Supreme Court denies PAGCOR’s appeal to remit the full amount of gross income to the Philippine Sports Commission since 1993.
- December 9–20 – The 1,600-strong Philippine delegation participate in the 2025 SEA Games in Thailand, the largest sent by the country to the SEA Games, finishing sixth place overall after winning 50 gold, 73 silver, and 154 bronze medals.

== Deaths ==
- January 7 – Mervin Guarte (b. 1992), middle distance runner and obstacle course racer (Southeast Asian Games multiple medalist)
- January 30 – Sammy Acaylar (b. 1958), volleyball coach (Perpetual Altas, Quezon City Gerflor Defenders, men's national team)
- February 25 – Alberto Lina (b. 1948), Philippine Basketball Association franchise owner (FedEX, Air21, Burger King and Shopinas)
- March 18 – Edwin Borja (b. 1958), Olympic swimmer (1972, 1976)
- April 7 – Vicki Brick (b. 1981), basketball player (Maryland Terrapins, women's national team) and businesswoman
- July 7 – Juan Cutillas (b. 1942), Spanish football coach (Kaya, Philippines national football team)
- July 16 – Bruce McTavish (b. 1939), New Zealand-born boxing referee
- December 7 – Jimmy Mariano (b. 1941), basketball player (Ysmael Steel Admirals) and coach (Great Taste Coffee Makers, UE Red Warriors)

== See also ==
- 2025 in the Philippines
- 2025 in sports
