= 2024 PSC Women in Sports Awards =

- Date: March 20, 2024
- Location: Rizal Memorial Coliseum, Manila
- Country: Philippines

Highlights
- Athletes of the Year: Alex Eala (Tennis); Sarina Bolden (Football)
- Lifetime Achievement Awardees: 6 awardees
- Flame Awardees: 5 awardees

The 2024 PSC–PSA Women in Sports Awards was an annual awarding ceremony honoring the individuals and teams for their contribution in women's sports in the Philippines. It was organized by the Philippine Sports Commission (PSC) in coordination with the Philippine Commission on Women (PCW).

This is the first edition of the PSC Women in Sports Awards. The awarding ceremony was held on March 20, 2024, at the Rizal Memorial Coliseum in Manila coinciding with International Women's Month. The PSC received 300 nominations from various national sports associations with weight given on results made in 2023. 50 major awards were conferred.

== Honor roll ==
The following were the awardees for the 1st Women in Sports Awards:

=== Main awardees ===
Award	Winner	Sport / team / recognition	References
Athletes of the Year	Alex Eala	Tennis	
Athletes of the Year	Sarina Bolden	Football (Philippine national team)	
Lifetime Achievement Award	Lydia de Vega	Athletics	
Lifetime Achievement Award	Elma Muros	Athletics	
Lifetime Achievement Award	Erlinda Lavandia	Athletics	
Lifetime Achievement Award	Arianne Cerdeña	Bowling	
Lifetime Achievement Award	Bong Coo	Bowling	
Lifetime Achievement Award	Adeline Dumapong	Powerlifting	
Lifetime Achievement Award	Beatriz Lucero Lhuillier	Taekwondo	
Flame Award	Hidilyn Diaz	Weightlifting	
Flame Award	Alyssa Valdez	Volleyball	
Flame Award	Margielyn Didal	Skateboarding	
Flame Award	Rubilen Amit	Snooker	
Flame Award	Carina Dayondon	Mountain climbing	
Main Individual Award	Jema Galanza	Volleyball	
Main Individual Award	Xiandi Chua	Swimming	
Main Individual Award	Vanessa Sarno	Weightlifting	
Main Individual Award	Jocel Lyn Ninobla	Taekwondo	
Main Individual Award	Jemyca Aribado	Squash	
Main Individual Award	Bien Zoleta Manalac	Soft Tennis	
Main Individual Award	Franchette Quiroz	Shooting	
Main Individual Award	Hergie Bacyadan	Boxing	
Main Individual Award	Bianca Bustamante	Motorsports	
Main Individual Award	Agatha Wong	Wushu	
Main Individual Award	Daisy Valdez	Surfing	
Main Individual Award	Joyce Gail Reboton	Powerlifting	
Main Individual Award	Cheska Altomonte	Softball	
Main Individual Award	Kheith Rhynne Cruz	Table Tennis	
Main Individual Award	Kim Mangrobang	Triathlon	
Main Individual Award	Pia Gabriel	Motorsports	
Main Individual Award	Cristina Vergara	Wrestling	
Main Individual Award	Mika de Guzman	Badminton	
Main Individual Award	Shagne Yaoyao	Cycling	
Main Individual Award	Joanie Delgaco	Rowing	
Main Individual Award	Sakura Alforte	Karate	
Main Individual Award	Islay Erika Bomogao	Muay Thai	
Main Individual Award	Aleah Finnegan	Gymnastics	
Main Individual Award	Rena Furukawa	Judo	
Main Individual Award	Princess Arbilon	Modern Pentathlon	
Main Individual Award	Sandi Menchi Abahan	Obstacle Course Racing	
Main Individual Award	Lealyn Baligasa	Canoe	
Main Individual Award	Marie Alexis Sy	Bowling	
Main Individual Award	Kaila Napolis	Jiujitsu	
Main Individual Award	Jack Animam	Basketball	
Main Individual Award	Marisa Baronda	Bowls	
Main Individual Award	Andrea Robles	Archery	
Main Individual Award	Nesthy Petecio	Boxing	
Main Individual Award	Janelle May Frayna	Chess	
Main Individual Award	Bianca Pagdanganan	Golf	
Main Individual Award	Angel Derla	Kun Bokator	
Main Individual Award	Sydney Sy Tancontian	Sambo	
Main Individual Award	Alaiza Belmonte	Softball	
Main Individual Award	Robyn Brown	Athletics	
Main Individual Award	Samantha Catantan	Fencing	
Main Individual Award	Renz Dacquel	Kickboxing	
Main Individual Award	Rassiel Sales	Rugby	
Main Individual Award	Cheska Centeno	Billiards	
Main Individual Award	Pearl Caneda	Dancesport	

=== Citations ===
Winner	Sport / team / recognition	References
Joy Reyes	National Academy of Sports sports director	
Veronica Cruz	Trainer and nutritionist	
Jeaneth Aro	Nutritionist	
Karen Trinidad	Sports psychologist	
Dyan Castillejo	Sportscaster	
Pia Cayetano	Women in Sports advocate	
Smart Omega Empress	Esports (team)	
Aielle Aguilar	Jiu-Jitsu	
Precious Aguilar	Obstacle course racing (coach)	
Mau Belen	Basketball 3x3 (coach)	
Ani De Leon Brown	Triathlon (coach)	
Josephine Canare	Bowling (coach)	
Kyle Catantan	Fencing	
Edelyn de Asis	Wheelchair dancesport	
Kaizen de la Serna	Obstacle course racing	
Francine Duchess	Canoe kayak (coach)	
Divina Gracia Escala	Soft tennis (coach)	
Maricon Fornea	Rowing (coach)	
Joanna Franquelli	Handball (coach)	
Jan Jodilyn Fronda	Chess	
Isabella Gamez	Figure skating	
Cheyzer Mendoza	Chess (parasport)	
Juliana Gomez	Fencing	
Alexa Larrazabal	Fencing	
Jamie Lim	Karate	
Rianne Malixi	Golf	
Joy Marino	Archery (coach)	
Precious Ocaya-Delarmino	Muaythai (coach)	
Haydee Ong	Basketball (coach)	
Rani Ortega	Taekwondo (coach)	
Ana Santiago	Softball (coach)	
Tots Carlos	Volleyball	
