= Yoie Bohlin =

Swedish multitalented sports woman

Personal information
- Nationality: Swedish
- Born: 26 September 1990 (age 35)
Medal record
Boxing
Swedish Junior Championships
Bronze medal – third place	2012	48 kg
Obstacle Racing
Spartan Race European Championships
Bronze medal – third place	2016	Edinburgh
Silver medal – second place	2017	Andorra
Athletics
Swedish Championships
Gold medal – first place	2011	Cross country 8 km team

Yoie Bohlin (born Johanna Bohlin on 26 September 1990) is a Swedish multitalented sports woman who has competed in inter alia Athletics, Trail running (Skyrunning, Mountain running), Soccer, Boxing and Obstacle racing. She has won victories over the years in different disciplines, but emerged into public focus on 20 August 2016, when she came out of nowhere to beat the reigning skyrunning world champion Emelie Forsberg and the world cup #2 Malene Haukøy by 15 minutes in the 33 km Stranda Fjord Trail Race in Norway.

== Childhood and youth ==
Bohlin grew up in Åtvidaberg in Sweden in a sports family. Her father Lars "Lasse" Bohlin today runs a marathon training camp in Kenya, Kimbia Camp. Mother Ulla Bohlin runs a gym in Åtvidaberg, "Hälsofabriken". Bohlin's elder sister Amanda Bohlin, born in 1989, is an accomplished short distance triathlete with a couple of Swedish Championship gold medals.

Bohlin's first name used to be Johanna but a cousin in the US called her Yoie. The nickname stuck and she eventually officially changed her name. For many years Bohlin has used the dreadlocks hair style and for that reason sometimes goes under the pseudonym Rastarunner, a name that she now also uses for her blog.

== Sports ==
=== Athletics ===
Bohlin ran her first marathon, the Stockholm Marathon, in 2008 in 2:59:00. Bohlin: "I did not think it was so tough". The marathon performance led to a 5000m spot in the annual Finland-Sweden Athletics International (Swedish: Finnkampen), the first time ever that Bohlin ran in a track competition.

The following year Bohlin improved her Stockholm Marathon time to 2:52:50.

==== Personal bests ====
The following list is based on information from All-Athletics.

Event	Year	Result
5 000 m	2008	16:54:90
10 000 m	2012	35:08:75
10 km road	2008	35:23
Half marathon	2009	1:18:42
30 km road	2009	2:03:22
Half marathon	2016	01:18:22
Marathon	2009	2:52:50

=== Trail running ===
In 2008 Bohlin became one of merely ten women to run the iconic Swedish 30K Lidingöloppet in less than two hours at 1:59:52, placing third. The following year Bohlin placed second in a slightly slower race on her 19th birthday.

In August 2016 won the 33K Stranda Fjord Trail Race in Norway by 15 minutes ahead of established trail running world stars Emelie Forsberg and Malene Haukøy.

=== Soccer ===
When a high school student Bohlin played soccer with Åtvidabergs FF and represented the province of Östergötland in its elite team for girls born in 1990.

=== Boxing ===
When at high school Bohlin started boxing in Åtvidabergs Boxningsklubb with a best result of bronze in the Junior Swedish Championships 48 kg class in 2008. As of 2016 she trains and fights for Narva Boxningsklubb.

=== Obstacle racing ===
In 2015 Bohlin won the Toughest Minitour. In 2016 she placed 3rd in the Spartan race European Championship in Edinburgh, Scotland, and in 2017 she placed second in the same event in Andorra. In 2017 Bohlin won the Arena Run in Stockholm, Sweden, ahead of OCR World Champion Lindsay Webster.

== Personal life ==
As of 2016 Bohlin officially resides in Åtvidaberg in Sweden, but spends a lot of time in Åre in the summer and Kenya in the winter.

For a living Bohlin works as a running coach for runners at different levels.
