= GoRuck =

American sporting equipment and events company

GORUCK
- Founded: January 2008
- Founder: Jason McCarthy
- Headquarters: Jacksonville, Florida
- Products: rucksacks, physical challenges
- Website: goruck.com

GORUCK is an American sporting equipment company founded in 2008 and based in Jacksonville Beach, Florida, that specializes in making rucksacks (i.e., backpacks). The company also organizes events with public participation or organized as private team-building events, known as "GORUCK challenges", that are similar to obstacle racing and military exercises.

== History ==
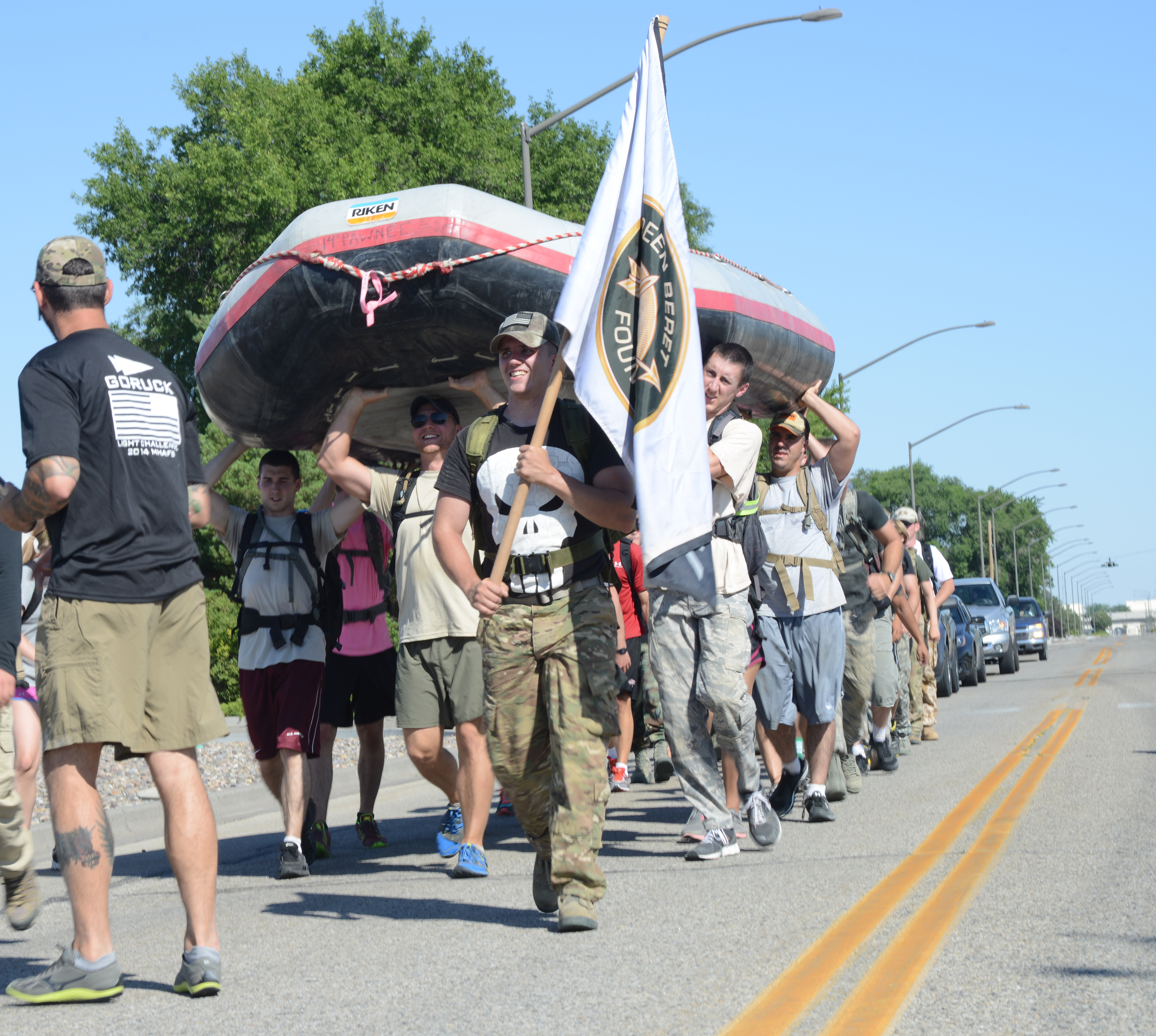
Members of the U.S. Air Force participating in a light-level GORUCK challenge event

The company was founded in 2008 by Jason McCarthy, a former Green Beret, to develop rucksacks inspired by those used by the U.S. Special Forces. McCarthy developed the company and its initial products while enrolled in a Master of Business Administration (MBA) program at Georgetown University, attending with help from the Post-9/11 GI Bill. He graduated from the program in 2011.

In addition to rucksacks, the company also sells clothing (hiking boots, pants, shorts, shirts, light jackets, and caps) and various accessories (e.g., gear carrying cases, weight bags, wallets, embroidered clothing patches, carabiners, and water bottles).

The company employs about 150 veterans of the U.S. Special Forces and Special Operations.

== Event organizing ==
The company promotes its brand by organizing and sponsoring "GORUCK challenges". The events are similar to obstacle racing and are based on Special Forces training exercises. The events have varying degrees of difficulty and involve participating in challenging activities while carrying weighted rucksacks. They are often conducted as team-building events – e.g., for corporate clients. Events of various duration and levels of difficulty are organized. In addition to their three standard levels of difficulty (called "basic", "tough", and "heavy"), the company offers special events. The company also holds firearms training events. GORUCK Selection, patterned directly after Special Forces Selection, is an individual event totaling 48+ hours and 80+ miles.

The company sponsored its first endurance challenge event in San Francisco, California, on September 25, 2010, and many such events have been held since then in various places across the United States. More than 900 of the events were held in 2017.

A participant was struck by a car and killed during one of the events on May 17, 2014. Afterwards, the company instituted a policy that every participant must have a high-visibility reflective band on their rucksack to reduce the chance of similar accidents. The events have been mistaken for protest marches on multiple occasions.
