= PSC Women in Sports Awards =

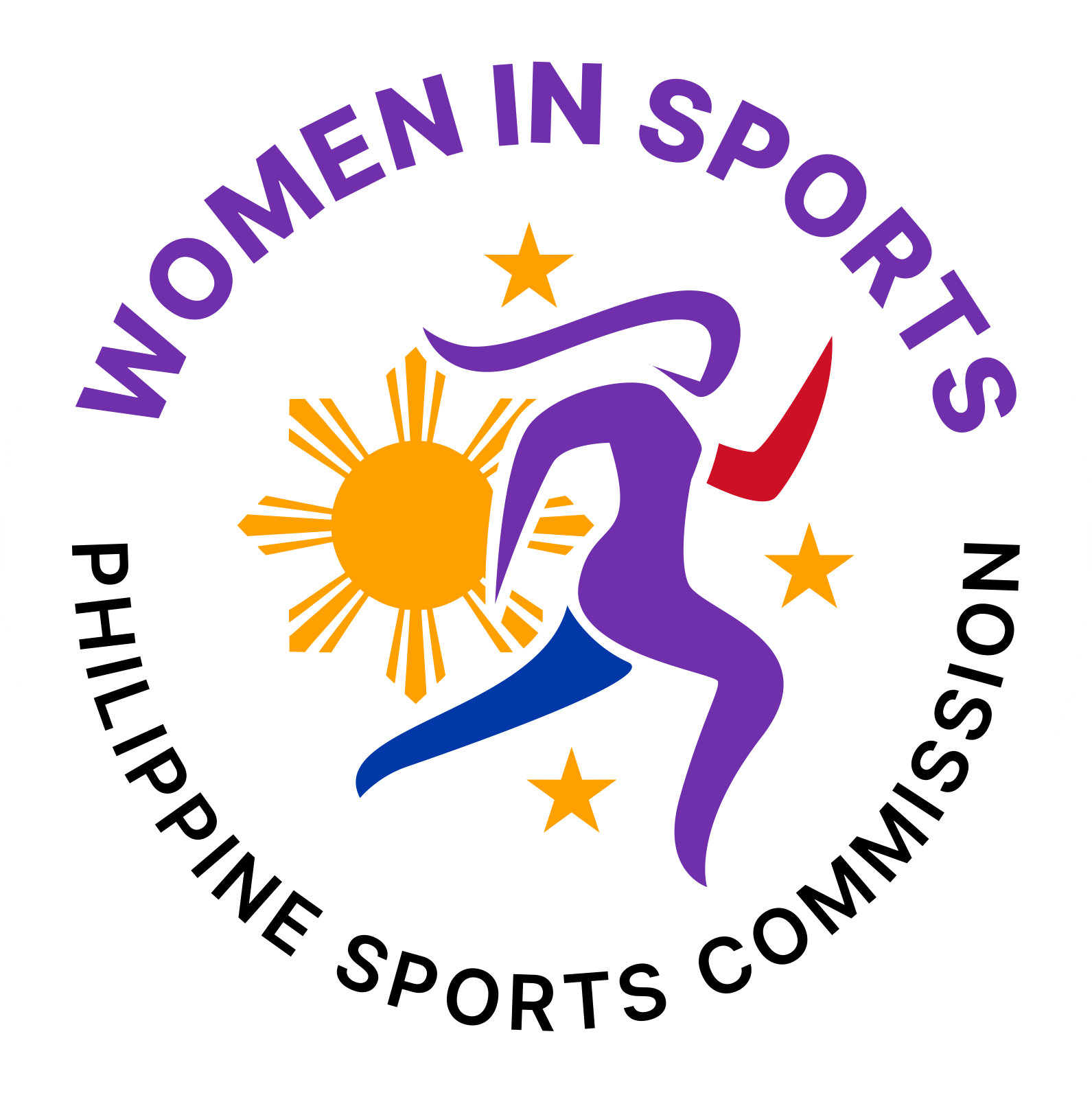
- Awarded for: Contributions to Philippine sports
- Country: Philippines
- Presented by: Philippine Sports Commission
- Eligibility: Women
- First award: 2024
- Related: PSA Annual Awards

The PSC Women in Sports Awards is an annual award by the state-run Philippine Sports Commission (PSC).

== History ==
The Women in Sports Awards is created by the Philippine Sports Commission (PSC) in coordination with the Philippine Commission on Women (PCW) to recognize the achievements and contributions of women Filipino athletes. Filipino bowler and PSC Commissioner Bong Coo specifically came up with conceptualizing the sports award project. The hosting of the award was first publicly announced on 5 March 2024 at PSA Forum.

The first edition of the awards meant to be held annually was held on March 20, 2024 at the Rizal Memorial Coliseum in Manila coinciding with International Women's Month. The PSC received 300 nominations from various national sports associations with weight given on results made in 2023. 50 major awards were conferred.

As early as March 2024, nominations for the 2025 awards are already being received. The second edition of the awards will be held on March 15, 2025 at the Century Park Hotel.

== Editions ==
Edition	Awarding ceremony date	Venue	Location
2024	March 20, 2024	Rizal Memorial Coliseum	Manila
2025	March 15, 2025	Century Park Hotel	Manila
2026	March 20, 2026	Philippine International Convention Center	Pasay
