= 2026 PSC Women in Sports Awards =

- Date: March 20, 2026
- Location: Philippine International Convention Center, Pasay
- Country: Philippines

Highlights
- Athletes of the Year: Philippines women's national football team

The 2026 PSC Women in Sports Awards also known as the 3rd All-Women Sports Awards is the third edition of the PSC Women in Sports Awards, an annual awarding ceremony honoring the individuals and teams for their contribution in women's sports in the Philippines. It was organized by the Philippine Sports Commission (PSC) in coordination of the Philippine Commission on Women.

The awards night will be held on March 20, 2026 at the Philippine International Convention Center in Pasay City. 83 female athletes, teams and personalities will be given recognition in the said awarding rites.

First Lady Liza Araneta Marcos, Senate President Tito Sotto and Senators Bong Go and Risa Hontiveros, Philippine Sports Commission Chairman Patrick Gregorio and the commissioners, Philippine Olympic Committee President Abraham Tolentino, Paralympic Committee of the Philippines President Michael Barredo and Philippine Commission of Women Commissioner Cecille La Madrid-Dy were invited to attend the affair.

== See also ==
- 2026 PSA Annual Awards
- 40th SAC-SMB Cebu Sports Awards
