= Stranda Fjord Trail Race =

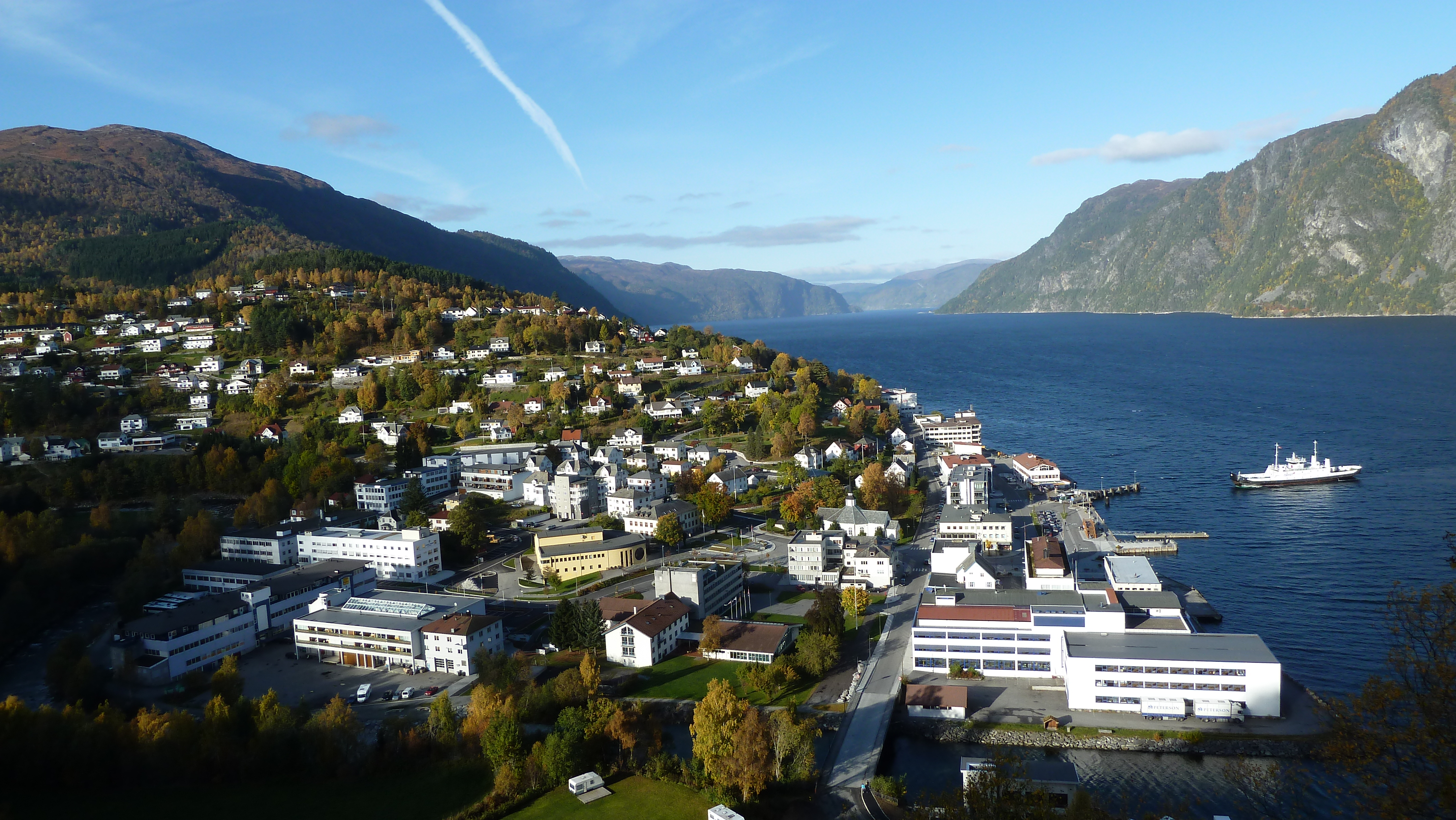
Stranda village

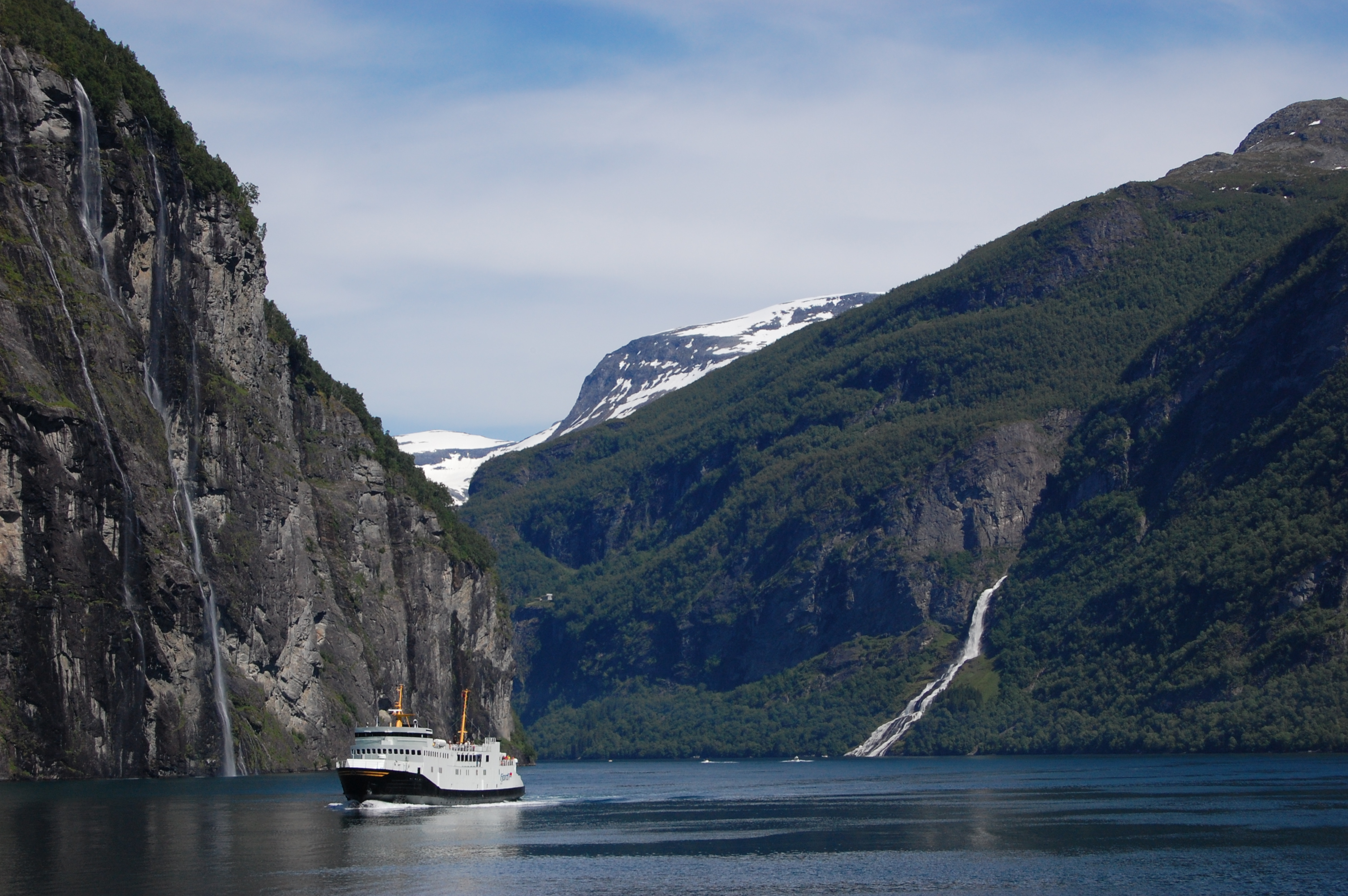
Geiranger Fjord

Stranda Fjord Trail Race is a 33-kilometre (21 mi) long-distance race with 3,000 m (9,800 ft) of vertical climb from start to finish. The race attracts many international runners and takes place since 2015 in the mountains in Stranda Municipality on the western Norwegian coast. The course takes the runners along the Geirangerfjord.

== Winners ==
The course records are for men 4:02:15 by Sindre Hoff (2016) and for women 4:39:13 by Yoie Bohlin (2016). Course records with green background in the table.

Year	Country	Man	Time	Country	Woman	Time
2015	Norway	Ola Hovdenak	4:03:20	Sweden	Kristin Larsson	5:38:59
2016	Norway	Sindre Hoff	4:02:15	Sweden	Yoie Bohlin	4:39:13
