= World Ninja League =

Sporting organization

The World Ninja League (WNL), formerly National Ninja League, is a not-for-profit organization dedicated to growing ninja-style obstacle course racing as a sport. In contrast to American Ninja Warrior, the WNL provides multiple competitions each season for athletes as young as 6 years old under a unified rule set.

== History ==
The World Ninja League was created by Chris and Brian Wilczewski, competitors on American Ninja Warrior and owners of the Movement Laboratory training facility, in the fall of 2015 as a way for competitors and fans of the show to have a unified off-season league between taping seasons. The first season had 15 qualifying events at 12 affiliate facilities and culminated in a World Championship at the Movement Laboratory in Hainesport, New Jersey in February 2016.

Season 2 saw the introduction of three youth divisions for athletes as young as 6 years old. The first championships for youth athletes were held at the Gymnastics Academy of Fairfield (Connecticut) for the Kids and Preteens divisions and iCore Fitness in West Chester, PA for the Teen division. Due to the popularity of ninja among youth athletes, two additional divisions - Mature Kids and Young Adults - were added the following season. Youth athletes now account for over 70% of the league's participation.

The league has rapidly expanded from 12 affiliate facilities in Season 1 to over 80 affiliate facilities in Season 5 in 27 states and 6 countries. The league also has partnerships with the Ninja Challenge League in Australia, French Ninja League, and Barbados Ninja Throwdown.

== Controversies ==
In 2025, the World Ninja League drew criticism from gym owners and athletes over the enforcement of an exclusivity policy prohibiting affiliated gyms from hosting competitions for other leagues. The policy was reported to affect events by the World Ninja League's competitor, the Ninja Sport Championship (NSC), which had been expanding its youth competition series. NSC representatives argued the rule would reduce opportunities for athletes and limit the competitive space, while WNL has stated that exclusivity is intended to maintain brand consistency and competitive integrity.

WNL has also faced past scrutiny over obstacle similarity concerns. In one case, obstacles at a participating gym were reported to closely resemble those planned for the World Championships, potentially allowing certain athletes to practice on them in advance.

== Format ==
At a World Ninja League qualifying competition, each athlete will run an obstacle course consisting of 10-20 obstacles in a predetermined order. Athletes receive only one attempt at each obstacle (with the exception of the Warped Wall) and must advance from the start platform to the finish platform with whatever means are available to them. The athlete in each division that advances the farthest into the course in the fastest amount of time, or the athlete that completes the entire course in the fastest amount of time, is declared the winner. The top three athletes in each division qualify for the annual World Championship at the end of the season; athletes that have already qualified defer their spots to the next available athlete.

One hallmark of the World Ninja League compared to other ninja organizations is that competitors cannot be told the path by which they must defeat an obstacle. For instance, on a set of monkey bars, the athlete cannot be told that they must touch each bar, start on the first bar, and/or finish on the last bar. Athletes can only be told the start and finish platforms, what they can and cannot use, and whether they can only use their hands or feet on a specific part of the obstacle. Occasionally, several obstacles will be linked together, in which case the athlete clears one obstacle in a set of obstacle by hand or foot placement on the next obstacle; the series of obstacles must ultimately finish on a finish platform.

== World Championship ==
Each season ends with the World Championship, a three-stage event in which competitors must complete all obstacles of each stage within the time limit to advance to the next stage. The athlete in each division that progresses the furthest the fastest is crowned that season's World Champion. In contrast from regular season competitions, each stage has 6-10 obstacles.

- Stage 1 consists of mostly lower-body and agility obstacles, as competitors race against the clock to demonstrate a basic set of skills. Time limits are usually 1 1/2 to 2 minutes.
- Stage 2 tests the athlete's power and explosiveness; time limits range wildly dependent on if this stage tests speed, endurance, or both.
- Stage 3 is an upper-body gauntlet with the World Champion determined by who can endure through some of the most difficult obstacles ever conceived. No adult/elite athlete had defeated Stage 3 until 2023 when both Noah Meunier and Tyler Smith were able to clear the stage. Tyler Smith cleared Stage 3 again in 2024 becoming the only athlete to clear the stage twice.

The World Championship is annually one of the largest ninja competitions in the world. The 2019 World Championship was the largest ninja event ever with 1,544 athletes.

Prior to 2019, the World Championship was split between an adult event and a youth event, both at a dedicated ninja facility. The 2019 event, hosted by Real Life Ninja Academy, was held at the XL Center Exhibition Hall in Hartford, Connecticut with both youth and adult athletes competing. Starting with the 2020 World Championship, the World Ninja League is the sole hosting entity with the tradition of hosting all age divisions in a convention center continuing at the Greensboro Coliseum Special Events Center in Greensboro, North Carolina.

=== Results ===
Although World Championships are contested in every division, this lists only the Adult (Season 1-5) or Elite (Season 6-) results.

Season	Date	Location	World Champion	2nd Place	3rd Place
1	February 26–27, 2016	Movement Laboratory; Hainesport, New Jersey	(United States) Geoff Britten (United States) Jesse Labreck	(United States) Drew Drechsel (United States) Allyssa Beird	(United States) Josh Cook (United States) Jeri D'Aurelio
2	March 4–5, 2017	Apex NorCal; Concord, California	(United States) Drew Drechsel (United States) Allyssa Beird	(Sweden) Alexander Mars (United States) Rachel Brown	(United States) Hunter Guerard (United States) McKinley Pierce
3	February 24–25, 2018	Ninja Quest Fitness; Marietta, Georgia	(United States) Drew Drechsel (Australia) Olivia Vivian	(United States) Jake Murray (United States) Lindsay Eskildsen	(United States) Jamie Rahn (United States) Tiana Webberley
4	February 16–18, 2019	XL Center Exhibition Hall; Hartford, Connecticut	(United States) Adam Rayl (United States) Jesse Labreck	(United States) Matt Strollo (United States) Casey Rothschild	(United States) Caleb Bergstrom (United States) Tegan Roobol
5	February 21–23, 2020	Greensboro Coliseum Special Events Center; Greensboro, North Carolina	(United States) Joe Moravsky (United States) Tiana Webberley	(United States) Daniel Gil (United States) Mady Howard	(United States) RJ Roman (United States) Abby Clark
6 (Note: As a result of border closures and restrictions stemming from the COVID-19 pandemic, only a limited number of American athletes competed, but the name World Championship remained for consistency purposes.)	June 26–July 3, 2021	Centercourt Lawrence; Lawrence, New Jersey	(United States) Jay Lewis (United States) Isabella Wakeham	(United States) Matthew Bradley (United States) Ava Colasanti	(United States) Matthew Hall (United States) Katie Bone
7	April 1–3, 2022	Greensboro Coliseum Special Events Center; Greensboro, North Carolina	(United States) Caleb Bergstrom (United States) Isabella Wakeham	(United States) Brady Parks (United States) Addy Herman	(United States) True Becker (United States) Jordan Carr
8	June 23–25, 2023	Greensboro Coliseum Special Events Center; Greensboro, North Carolina	(United States) Tyler Smith (United States) Addy Herman	(United States) Jay Lewis (United States) Abby Clark	(United States) Jackson Erdos (United States) Isabella Wakeham
9	June 21–24, 2024	Greensboro Coliseum Special Events Center; Greensboro, North Carolina	(United States) Jackson Erdos (Canada) Nora Brown-John	(United States) Gavin Obey (United States) Abby Clark	(United States) Tom Alberti (United States) Hannah Grella
10	June 20–24, 2025	Greensboro Coliseum Special Events Center; Greensboro, North Carolina	(United States) Noah Meunier (United States) Addy Herman	(United States) Jackson Erdos (United States) Adelena Messier	(United States) Phil Folsom (United States) Abby Clark
11	June 18–23, 2026	Greensboro Coliseum Special Events Center; Greensboro, North Carolina	(United States) Jackson Erdos (United States) Ryley Hunt	(United States) Charlie Ball (United States) Allison Bond	(United States) Josiah Pippel (United States) Addy Herman

== Rec Ninja League ==
Launched in spring 2018, the Rec Ninja League is designed for beginner to intermediate athletes that might not be ready for the challenges that a WNL course would provide. The Rec Ninja League operates in a similar manner to the WNL with the same rules surrounding obstacles with the exception that each course is 10 obstacles long, 9 of which are easier than a standard WNL course, and the athlete will attempt each of the 10 obstacles for points. Athletes earn one point per obstacle cleared and five bonus points for defeating all ten obstacles on the course. The athlete in each division and region that accrues the most points over multiple competitions will be crowned Obstacle King/Queen, and the top three athletes that did not qualify for the previous season's World Championship earn qualification to the following season's World Championship.

In its second season, the Rec League had over 500 athletes, many of which competed in their first regular season WNL competition in the ensuing season.

== Differences from American Ninja Warrior ==
- No applications are required to compete in the World Ninja League; athletes merely need to register for the competition at their local WNL-affiliated facility.
- Athletes are not only allowed but encouraged to compete in multiple competitions in a season, compared to American Ninja Warrior in which competitors may only compete in one regional qualifying round.
- The WNL has 100+ qualifying events each season compared to 5-6 for American Ninja Warrior.
- Each qualifying course can have between 10 and 20 obstacles, leading to a variety of different styles of courses from speed courses (with approximate completion times of 1 1/2 to 2 minutes) to endurance courses (with approximate completion times of 6 to 8 minutes).
- Events are live streamed on Facebook or YouTube with full results available on the WNL's website, negating the need for airing on tape delay and non-disclosure agreements.

== Notes ==
1. For instance, if the athletes in first, third, and fifth places have already qualified, the qualification spots go to the athletes in second, fourth, and sixth place. Athletes must complete at least one obstacle in order to qualify.

2. Part of the San Francisco Bay area.

3. Despite being under 18, Rachel was grandfathered into the Adult division.

4. Part of the Atlanta metropolitan area.

5. Hosted by the Real Life Ninja Academy.
