= 2025 PSC Women in Sports Awards =

- Date: March 15, 2025
- Location: Century Park Hotel, Manila
- Country: Philippines

Highlights
- Athletes of the Year: Nesthy Petecio; Aira Villegas

The 2025 PSC Women in Sports Awards also known as the 2nd All-Women Sports Awards is the second edition of the PSC Women in Sports Awards, an annual awarding ceremony honoring the individuals and teams for their contribution in women's sports in the Philippines. It was organized by the Philippine Sports Commission (PSC) in coordination of the Philippine Commission on Women.

As early as March 2024, nominations for the 2025 awards are already being received. The awarding ceremony is scheduled to be held on March 15, 2025 at the Century Park Hotel in Manila. There will be 136 awardees.

== Honor roll ==
The following were the awardees for the 2nd Women in Sports Awards:

=== Main awardees ===
Award	Winner	Sport / team / recognition	References
Athletes of the Year	Nesthy Petecio	Boxing (2024 Paris Olympics bronze medalists)	
Athletes of the Year	Aira Villegas	Boxing (2024 Paris Olympics bronze medalists)	
Lifetime Achievement Award	Meggie Ochoa	Jujutsu	
Flame Award	Alex Eala	Tennis	
Flame Award	Agatha Wong	Wushu	
Flame Award	Rosalinda Ogsimer	Ultramarathon	
Posthumous Award	Mona Sulaiman	Athletics	
Posthumous Award	Lita dela Rosa	Bowling	
Posthumous Award	Elizabeth Celis	Sportswriting	
Posthumous Award	Haydee Coloso-Espino	Swimming	
Outstanding Female Coach Award	Precious Delarmino	Muaythai	
Outstanding Female Coach Award	Mitchell Martinez	Boxing	
Sports Executive Award	Sarita Zafra	Triathlon (Vice President, Triathlon Philippines)	
Sports Executive Award	Leonora Escollante	Canoe, Kayak and Dragon Boat (President, Philippine Canoe Kayak Dragonboat Federation)	
Sports Executive Award	Princess Galura	Triathlon (President, Sunrise Events)	
Sports Executive Award	Drolly Claravall	Athletics (President, National Masters and Seniors Athletic Association of the Philippines)	
Sports Executive Award	Ma. Luisa Guinto	Sports Education (Associate Professor and Research Director, UP Diliman College of Human Kinetics)	
Sports Executive Award	Geraldine Go Bernardo	Sports Education (Executive Director, De La Salle University Office of Sports Development)	
Special Citation	Nicole dela Cruz	Running (Founder, Women's Run PH)	
Special Citation	Cecille Quimlat	Sports broadcasting (Station Manager, Sports Radio 918 kHz AM)	
Special Citation	Gianne dela Cruz	Community sports (Program Officer for Student Leadership and Organizations, Ateneo de Manila University)	
Special Citation	Jessica Esparrago	Sports leadership (Head Coach, Xavier University – Ateneo de Cagayan Japan Karate Association Team)	
Special Citation	Jaramia Amarnani	Cycling (Founder, Pinay Bike Commuter Facebook page)	
Special Citation	Monica Jorge	Grassroots (Executive Director, Milo Best Center)	

=== Major awardees ===
Winner	Sport / team / recognition	References
Kyra Abella	Kurash	
Sakura Alforte	Karate	
Elreen Ando	Weightlifting	
Jack Animam	Basketball	
Rubilen Amit	Billiards	
Gina Iniong-Araos	Kickboxing	
Jemyca Aribado	Squash	
Cendy Asusano	Para-Athletics	
Hergie Bacyadan	Boxing/kickboxing	
Agustina Bantiloc	Para-Archery	
Binibinis Ultimate	Ultimate frisbee	
Islay Erika Bomogao	Muaythai	
Rosita Bradborn	Lawn bowls	
Precious Cabuya	Obstacle course racing	
Samantha Catantan	Fencing	
Princess Catindig	Soft tennis	
Kheith Rhynne Cruz	Table tennis	
Kimberly Custodio	Jujutsu	
Zion Darailay	Wushu	
Edelyn de Asis	Para-Dancesport	
Kaila Jane dela Torre	Surfing	
Margielyn Didal	Shooting	
Kira Ellis	Triathlon	
Andrea Estrella	Para-Obstacle course racing	
Sofia Frank	Figure skating	
Chloe Galamgam	Memory sports	
Philippine women's national team (Gilas Pilipinas)	Basketball	
Aliah Rose Gavalez	Wrestling	
Achelle Guion	Para-Powerlifting	
Lauren Hoffman	Athletics	
Janah Lavador	Vovinam	
Bernadette Lim	Bocce	
Rianne Malixi	Golf	
Cheyzer Mendoza	Para-Chess	
Tachiana Mangin	Taekwondo	
Kristine Kate Mercado	Jetski	
Veronica Ompod	Powerlifting	
Angel Otom	Para-Swimming	
Annie Lou Parungao	Mixed martial arts (Amateur)	
Philippine women's national team (Ruelle Canino, Janelle Mae Frayna, Jan Jodilyn Fronda, Bernadette Galas, Shaina Mae Mendoza)	Chess	
Philippine women's national team	Dragonboat	
Philippine women's national team (Volcanoes)	Rugby sevens	
Jiah Pingot	Wrestling	
Lara Posadas-Wong	Bowling	
Andrea Robles	Archery	
Levi Ruivivar	Gymnastics	
Franchette Quiroz	Shooting	
Juliana Sevilla	Modern pentathlon	
Smart Omega Empress	Esports (Mobile Legends: Bang Bang)	
Philippine women's national team (Siklab Pilipinas)	Netball	
Jedah Soriano	Arnis	
Merry Joy Trupa	Duathlon	
Angeline Virina	Pencak Silat	
Kiyomi Watanabe	Judo	
Eza Rai Yalong	Arnis	
Shagne Yaoyao	Cycling	
Aislinn Yap	Sambo	
Denice Zamboanga	Mixed martial arts (Professional)	

=== Citations ===
Winner	Sport / team / recognition	References
Helen Aclopen	Kurash	
Jessica Agra	Padel	
Philippine women's national team (Alas Pilipinas)	Volleyball	
Dottie Ardina	Golf	
Mazel Paris Alegado	Skateboarding	
Ana Nualla-Aranar	Dancesport	
Miriam Grace Balisme	Wrestling	
Flordeliza Baento	Bocce	
Johanna Barbero	Wushu	
Arianne Brito	Karate	
Riezel Buenaventura	Athletics	
Melissa Campos	Obstacle course racing	
Marian Capadocia; Joanna Tao Yee Tan	Padel	
Jolly Co	Jujutsu	
Angeline Colonia	Weightlifting	
Juvenile Crisostomo; Zyka Santiago; Stella Yape	Taekwondo	
Jeniva Consigna	Sambo	
Sam Corpuz	Triathlon	
Creamline Cool Smashers	Volleyball	
Yvonne Alyssa Dalida	Squash	
Maricel dela Torre	Mixed martial arts (Amateur)	
Lexi Dormitorio	Cycling	
Ariana Drake	Diving	
Antonette Garcia	Bowling	
Mika de Guzman	Badminton	
Joanie Delgaco	Rowing	
Apryl Eppinger	Jujutsu	
Aleah Finnegan	Gymnastics	
Christel Rei Fuentespina	Badminton	
Nicole Gan	Golf	
Stephanie Gan	Golf	
Dylwynn Gimena	Judo	
Josa Gonzales	Sailing	
Nicole Habierto	Kurash	
Lovely Inan	Weightlifting	
Wilhelmina Lozada	Fencing	
Joan Denise Lumbao	Karate	
Tennielle Madis	Tennis	
Emma Malabuyo	Gymnastics	
Jocel Lyn Ninobla	Taekwondo	
Bianca Pagdanganan	Golf	
Dani Palanca	Jujutsu	
Dol Pamati-An	Para-Powerlifting	
Riza Pasuit	Boxing	
Skye Patenia	Figure skating	
Philippine women's national team	Beach handball	
Philippine women's national team	Ice hockey	
Philippine women's national team (Blu Girls)	Softball	
Annie Ramirez	Jujutsu	
Kayla Sanchez	Swimming	
Christy Sañosa	Soft tennis	
Vanessa Sarno	Weightlifting	
Philippine women's national team (Sibol)	Esports	
Joanne Tan	Jujutsu	
Sydney Sy Tancontian	Sambo	
Ricca Torres; Sam Veguillas; Allison Quiroga	Karate	
Dylan Valmores	Jujutsu	

== See also ==
- 2025 PSA Annual Awards
- 2nd Pacquiao–Elorde Awards
