= Devils Circuit =

Indian obstacle course race

- Genre: Obstacle Course Race
- Country: India
- Inaugurated: 2012
- Founders: Adnan Adeeb, Zeba Zaidi
- Organiser: Spectacom Global
- Website: devilscircuit.com

Devils Circuit is an Indian obstacle course race consisting of a 5-kilometre track with 15 military-style obstacles. The race is divided into three categories: Masters, Competitive, and Non-Competitive.

The event was founded in 2012 by Adnan Adeeb and Zeba Zaidi. Since its inception, Devils Circuit has hosted over 65 editions across India and has welcomed participants from diverse backgrounds, including military personnel, fitness enthusiasts, and working professionals. Athletes from more than 50 countries have taken part in the race.

== History ==
The first edition of Devils Circuit took place in Ludhiana in 2012, where participants tackled running, climbing, crawling, and jumping challenges. Over the years, the format has evolved, with new event formats introduced such as the Corporate Challenge, College Frenzy, and Virtual Challenges during the COVID-19 pandemic. As of 2025, the race has completed over 69 editions and launched its 13th season, covering 12 cities across India.

== Format ==
The Devils Circuit includes both competitive and non-competitive waves. In the competitive division, participants accumulate points across races based on their finishing times. To qualify for the overall title, athletes must participate in at least six races during the season.

The top male and female athletes on the leaderboard at the end of the season are awarded cash prizes of ₹2,00,000 each and a Maruti Suzuki Swift. The total prize pool exceeds ₹5,00,000.
