= 40th SAC-SMB Cebu Sports Awards =

Annual athletic award

40th SAC–SMB Annual Awards
- Date: March 8, 2026
- Location: Ayala Center Cebu, Cebu City
- Country: Philippines

The 40th SAC–SMB Cebu Sports Awards was an annual awarding ceremony organized by the Sportswriters Association of Cebu (SAC) in partnership with San Miguel Brewery (SMB), recognizing Cebu’s top athletes, coaches, and teams who achieved outstanding success in 2025.

The event was held on March 8, 2026 at the Ayala Center Cebu Activity Center in Cebu City, coinciding with the awards’ 40th anniversary since its inaugural staging, with 88 sports personalities and groups cited for their excellence and impact in various national and international competitions, including the 2025 Southeast Asian Games.

Philippine Sports Commission Chairman Patrick Gregorio, who previously worked as General Manager of Waterfront Cebu City Hotel and Casino and chairman of the Cebu Visitors and Convention Bureau before taking leadership posts in Philippine sports, was served as the guest speaker.

The Sportswriters Association of Cebu, currently headed by John Pages of Sun.Star Cebu is an affiliate member of the Philippine Sportswriters Association and it is composed of Cebu-based sportswriters from newspapers and online news sites.

== Honor roll ==
=== Main awardees ===
Award	Winner	Sport/Team/Recognition	References\
Athlete of the Year	Elreen Ando	Weightlifting; Gold Medalist, Women's 63 kg, 2025 Southeast Asian Games	
Rico Navarro Sportsman of the Year	Lorenzo "Chao" Sy	Basketball and Boxing; Commissioner, Cebu City Sports Commission, Former Team Manager of La Fortuna Basketball Team and Boxing Promoter and Owner, Chao Sy Boxing Stable	
President's Award	Augusto Go	School sports Founder, University of Cebu and President, Cebu Schools Athletic Foundation, Inc.	
ORLACSAN Award (named after former The Freeman and SunStar Cebu sports editor Orlando C. Sanchez)	J. R. Quiñahan	Basketball; Typhoon Kalmaegi (Tino) survivor and rescuer	
ORLACSAN Award (named after former The Freeman and SunStar Cebu sports editor Orlando C. Sanchez)	Elmer Tuburan	Basketball; Typhoon Kalmaegi (Tino) survivor and rescuer	
ORLACSAN Award (named after former The Freeman and SunStar Cebu sports editor Orlando C. Sanchez)	Christian Jay Abarquez	Taekwondo; Typhoon Kalmaegi (Tino) survivor and rescuer	

=== Major awardees ===
A total of 43 athletes and 5 teams from 26 sports will be given the Major Awards, while some of them are nominated for the coveted Athlete of the Year honors.

Winner	Sport
Raven Alcoseba	Triathlon
Rubilen Amit	Billiards
Elreen Ando	Weightlifting
Ann Antolihao	Softball
Jerome Bacarisas	Softball
Jay Bryan Baricuatro	Boxing
Lloyd Bartolini	Dancesport
Angelica Bengtsson	Floorball
Jasper Cabrera	Softball
Felix Calipusan, Jr	Karate
Fritz Gerald Carsola	Sepak takraw
Cebu F.C.	Football
Aeden Roffer Cereno	Taekwondo
Margielyn Didal	Skateboarding
June Mar Fajardo	Basketball
Mark Ashley Fajardo	Boxing
Clarissa Louise Gallego	Taekwondo
Richard Gonzales	Table tennis
Eleanor Hayco	Dancesport
Matthew Hermosa	Triathlon
Jeff Leonard Hortelano	Ultimate frisbee
Melvin Jerusalem	Boxing
Janah Jade Lavador	Kickboxing
Eliecha Zoe Malilay	Ju-jitsu
Ellise Xoe Malilay	Ju-jitsu
Rico Mascariñas	Chess
Jonathan "Titing" Manalili	Basketball
Melvin Alm Mendoza	Floorball
Jeremy Laurence Nopre	Karate
Jose Martin Omayan	Taekwondo
Arthur Craig Pantino	Tennis
Philippines national esports team (Sibol Women's MLBB)	Esports
Mallie Ramirez	Football
Kim Remolino	Triathlon
Miranda Renner	Swimming
Sisi Rondina	Beach volleyball
Sacred Heart School – Ateneo de Cebu Magis Eagles	Basketball (CESAFI)
Jean Marie Sucalit	Sepak takraw
Eljay Dan Tormis	Table tennis
Artjoy Torregosa	Athletics
Raph Trinidad	Wakeboarding
Kelly Alexandrei Trocio	Karate
University of Cebu Webmasters	Table tennis (CESAFI)
University of the Visayas Green Lancers	Basketball (CESAFI)
Jerish John Velarde	Chess
Alexis Nicole Villacarlos	Karate
Christwil Villanueva	Motocross
Franklin Ferdie Yee	Duathlon

=== Special citations ===
31 sports personalities and collegiate teams who won the championship titles in the Cebu Schools Athletic Foundation, Inc. (CESAFI) will receive special citations from the SAC.

Winner	Sport
Marlon Aliño	Dancesport
Christian Araneta	Boxing
Christian Balunan	Boxing
Christopher Bureros	Weightlifting (Coach)
Nickson Andwele Cabañero	Baseball
Aaron Ray Cañete	Basketball (Referee)
Joph Cleopas	Basketball(Coach)
Oliver Colina	Football (Coach)
Gary Cortes	Basketball (Coach)
Lucy Hamilton	Dancesport
Arvin Loberanis	Athletics (Coach)
Mark Mahinay	Athletics
Juancho Miguel Masecampo	Shooting
Everett Pete Niere	Tennis
Rodex Piala	Boxing
Glenn Ramos	Football (Coach)
Rommel Rasmo	Basketball (Coach)
Roland Remolino	Triathlon (Coach)
Allison Kyle Quiroga	Karate
Rhodee Saavedra	Karate (Coach)
Sacred Heart School – Ateneo de Cebu Magis Eagles	Basketball (CESAFI)
Arlando Senoc	Boxing
Ramon Solis	Weightlifting (Coach)
Lord Garnette Talisic	Scrabble
Claudwin Seven Toñacao	Tennis
Toledo Xignex Trojans	Chess
University of Cebu Webmasters	Volleyball (CESAFI)
University of San Carlos Lady Warriors	Volleyball (CESAFI)
University of San Jose–Recoletos Lady Jaguars	Volleyball (CESAFI)
University of the Visayas Green Lancers	Basketball (CESAFI)
Juvels Velos	Tennis

=== Posthumous Awards ===
These awards will be given to Cebuano sports personalities who died in 2025.

- Eduardo Gullas (Basketball)
- Julian Macoy (Basketball)
- Jun Noel (Basketball)
- Fritz Tabura (Tennis)

== See also ==
- 2025 in Philippine sports
- 2026 PSA Annual Awards
