= Vicki Brick =

Filipino-American basketball player (1981–2025)

Personal information
- Born: July 30, 1981 Towson, Maryland, U.S.
- Died: April 7, 2025 (aged 43)
- Listed height: 5 ft 7 in (1.70 m)

Career information
- High school: McDonogh
- College: Maryland (2000–2004)
- Position: Guard

Career history
- 2006: Sydney Uni Flames
Medals
Women's basketball
Representing Philippines
SEABA Championship
Silver medal – second place	2007 Phuket	Team
SEA Games
Bronze medal – third place	2007 Nakhon Ratchashima	Team

Victoria Lynne Brick-Zupancic (July 30, 1981 – April 4, 2025) was a Filipino American basketball player and businesswoman.

== Early life and education ==
Victoria Lynne Brick was born on July 1981 in Towson, Maryland to Lynne and Victor Brick. Brick was a student at the University of Maryland and is a bachelor's degree holder in kinesiology and communications.

== Career ==
Brick played for McDonogh School's basketball team. She later suited up for the Maryland Terrapins women's basketball team at the American National Collegiate Athletic Association (NCAA) from 2000 to 2004. She was team captain of the Terps in her senior year, leading them to the NCAA second round. She was named part of the All-ACC Academic Team in all four years.

She played at Australia for the Sydney Uni Flames in the Women's National Basketball League.

Brick under coach Fritz Gaston played for the Philippines women's national team which finished runners-up in the 2007 SEABA Championship for Women and won a bronze medal at the 2017 SEA Games. The national team has just been reorganized under the Samahang Basketbol ng Pilipinas after the country's two-year suspension from FIBA.

== Brick Bodies Fitness Services ==
After retiring, Brick returned to the United States and began working at Brick Bodies Fitness Services; a fitness gym chain in the Baltimore started by her parents in 1985. She rose to a general manager role and in 2013 became vice president of Brick Bodies. In 2015, she succeeded her father as CEO.

Brick was named part of the 50 Women to Watch list by The Baltimore Sun in 2013 and was recognized as Top Executive in March 2015 by Smart CEO.

== Illness and death ==
Brick died on April 7, 2025, three years after being diagnosed with ovarian cancer.

== Personal life ==
Brick was married to Evan Zupancic with whom she had a daughter.
