= Century Park Hotel =

Hotel in Manila, Philippines

Coordinates: 14°33′42″N 120°59′29″E

- Former names: Century Park Sheraton Manila

General information
- Status: Completed
- Location: Manila, Philippines, 599 P. Ocampo Street, Manila
- Opening: September 1976
- Owner: Maranaw Hotels and Resort Corp. (LT Group)

Technical details
- Floor count: 19

Other information
- Number of rooms: 478

Website
- www.centurypark.com.ph

The Century Park Hotel, formerly the Century Park Sheraton Manila, is a hotel in Manila, Philippines. The hotel is hosted in a 19-storey building and has 478 rooms as of 2015.

== History ==
=== As Century Park Sheraton Manila ===
In 1974, the Philippine government encouraged the private sector to build hotels in anticipation of the 1976 International Monetary Fund-World Bank (IMF-WB) annual meeting to be hosted in the country. The government made funds available to private firms willing to build hotels at low interest rates. The Marsteel Corporation, an integrated steel manufacturing firm entered into a joint venture agreement with All Nippon Airways Enterprise, Co. Ltd. (ANAE) to convert the Maranaw Hotels and Resort Corporation (MHRC) into a joint venture corporation for the purpose of building a hotel at a 26,000 square meters (280,000 sq ft) site at the Harrison Park in Malate, Manila. In 1975, MHRC entered in a franchise agreement with the Sheraton Hotel and Inns Worldwide to allow the usage of the Sheraton brand for its hotel.

The Century Park Hotel partially opened in September 1976 as the Century Park Sheraton Manila. Century Park Sheraton, along with 14 other deluxe hotels in Metro Manila was opened in time for the IMF-WB meeting.

The hotel began with a coffee shop and about 300 rooms in its first month of operation. Gradually, other facilities of the hotel was made available to the public. By the time, the hotel is already in full operation, it already has 450 available rooms, eight food and beverage outlets, a shopping arcade, a medical clinic, a dental clinic, a barber shop, and a beauty shop. In 1980, a new wing called Park Tower Suites was opened. The wing contained 60 suites, each with a small kitchen. However the hotel's operation was adversely affected by the 1981 Harrison Plaza fire. Sipalay Trading Corporation of Lucio Tan became a major stockholder of the hotel on April 19, 1985.

=== As Century Park Hotel ===
The franchise agreement allowing the hotel to use the Sheraton Hotel brand was not renewed in 1996 and the name of the hotel became Century Park Hotel.

The hotel is known for accommodating China's paramount leaders during their visits to the Philippines including Xi Jinping, Hu Jintao and Jiang Zemin.

In 2025, one of the Philippines' Top Comedy Podcast The Koolpals opened its bar at the hotel's The Cellar that hosts its live podcast recording sessions and stand-up comedy sessions.
