= Obstacle course racing =

Sports discipline

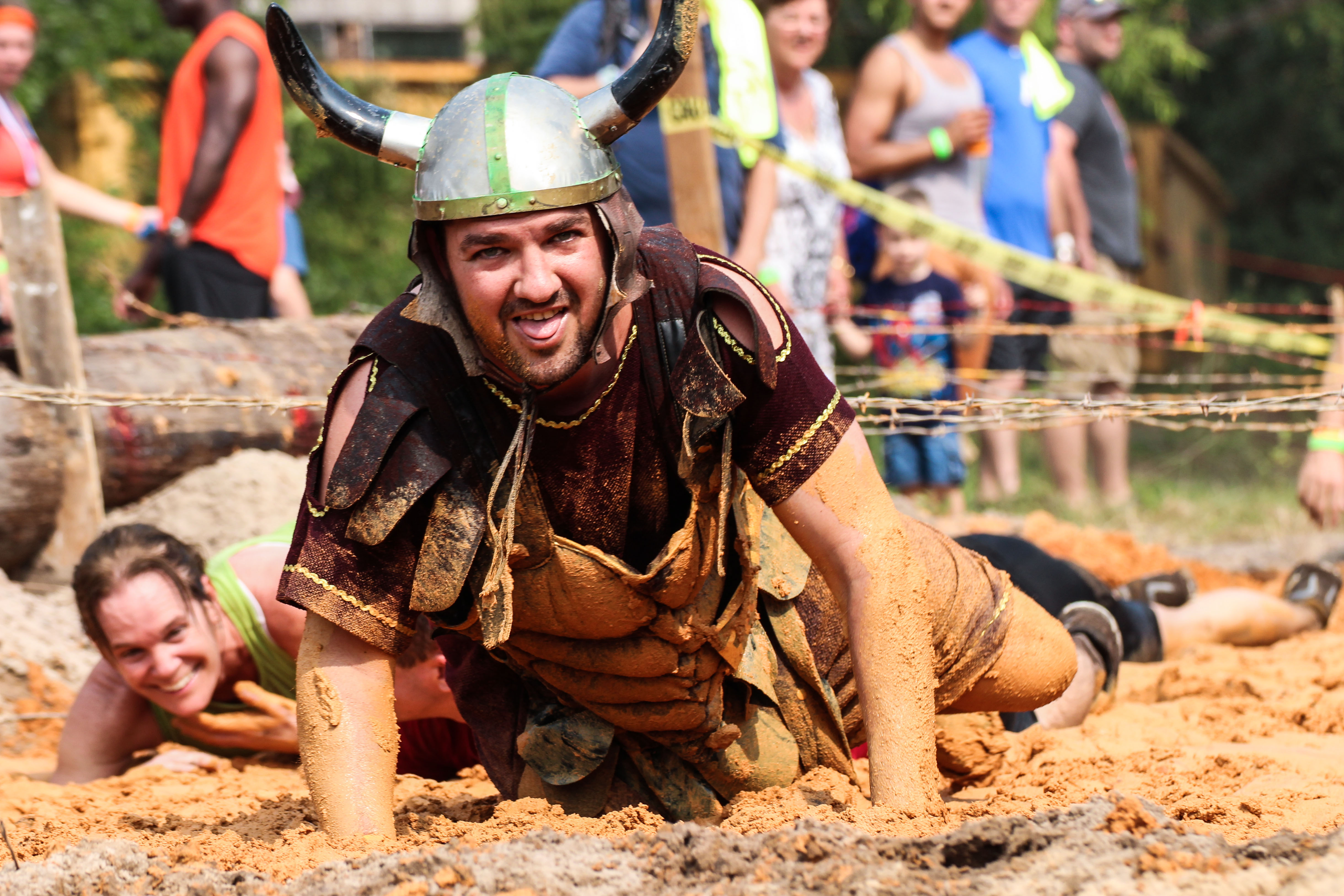
- An obstacle racer, dressed in costume, crawls through a mud pit topped with barbed wire.
- Highest governing body: World Obstacle (FISO)
- Nicknames: OCR

Characteristics
- Type: Outdoor or indoor

Presence
- Country or region: Worldwide
- Olympic: Part of the Summer Olympic sport of Modern pentathlon since 2028

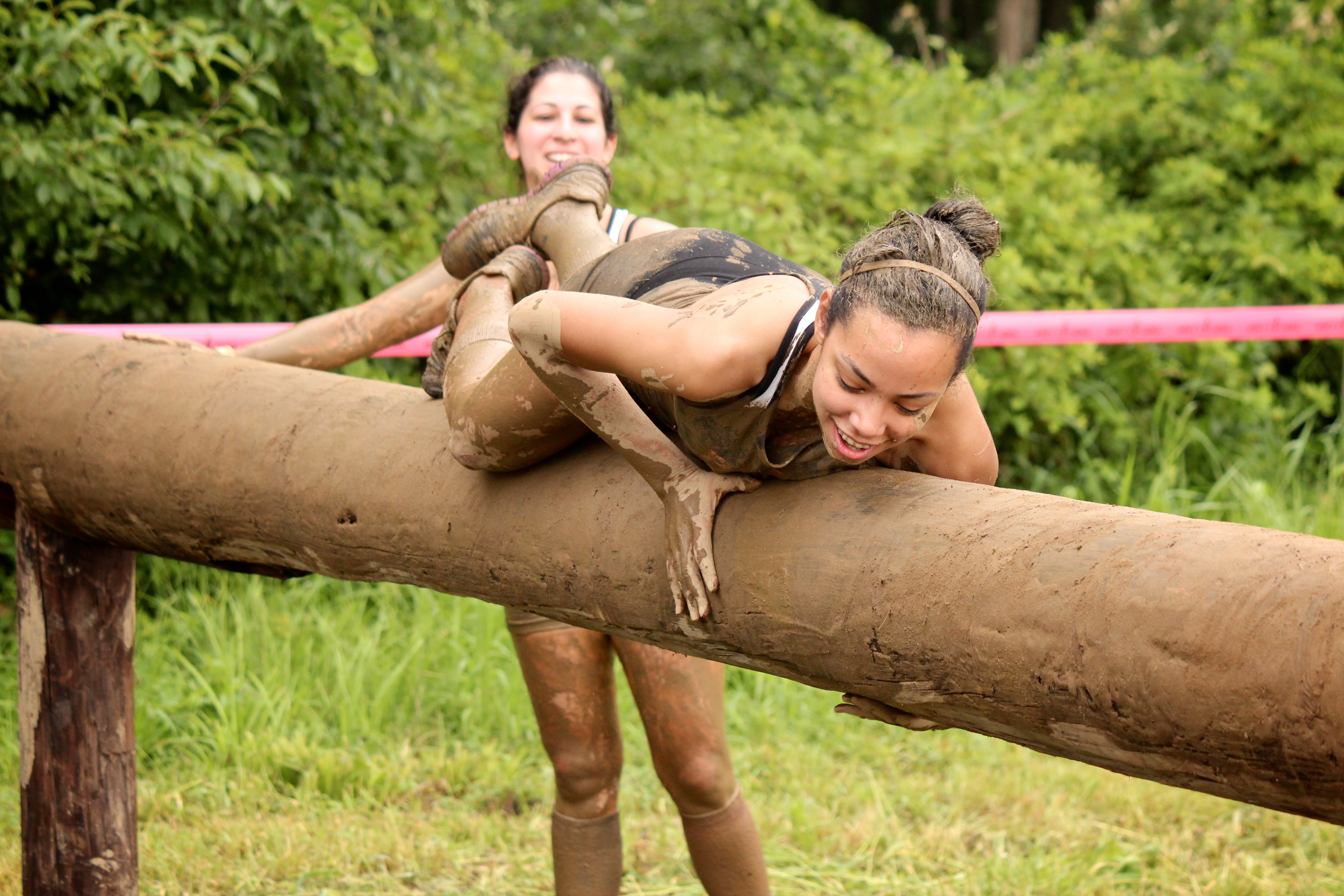
A mud run participant climbs over a typical obstacle: the horizontal beam.

Obstacle course racing (OCR) is a sport in which a competitor, traveling on foot, must overcome various physical challenges in the form of obstacles. Races vary in length from courses with obstacles close together to events of several kilometers which incorporate elements of track, road and/or cross country/trail running. Courses may include climbing over walls or up ropes, monkey bars, carrying heavy objects, traversing bodies of water or mud, crawling under barbed wire, and jumping through fire. Since the beginning of modern OCR with the Tough Guy Competition in 1987, the sport has grown in popularity such that more than 2500 events are held annually across the world and several run organizing companies are commercially successful.

== History ==
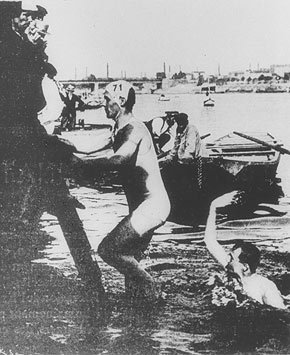
1900 Olympics Obstacle Swim

=== Early history ===
The concept of using obstacles for competition has been in use since the 1800s, including the 200m Obstacle Swim at the 1900 Summer Olympic Games in Paris, with the first formal land-based races in the Obstacle Run of military pentathlon, first held at the Military Physical Training Centre, at Freiburg, in the French occupation zone in Germany, in August 1947. Only Belgian, Dutch, and French teams took part in the competition. Since 1950, annual world championships have been held. The sport has grown in popularity, and now over 138 countries participate in the World Military Games. The sport's governing body, the International Military Sports Council (CISM), now also organise pentathlons aimed at naval and air force personnel.

=== Modern history ===
Tough Guy is widely considered to be the earliest contemporary OCR, with the first race held in 1987. The survivalrun also emerged in the late 1980s in the Netherlands. This began when the setters of a drag hunt trail in the village of Beltrum organized a foot race that incorporated the natural obstacles of the course. There are now more than 30 annual survivalruns in the Netherlands which incorporate both natural and built obstacles and form an organized amateur competition. The HiTec Adventure Racing Series (1996 - 2002) was an early version of the contemporary race and included "special tests" (man-made obstacles with walls, nets, etc.), mountain biking, and kayaking. The Balance Bar races in the United States expanded on the success of the Hi-Tech series, including a televised national series and championships. The Muddy Buddy races in the United States were a national obstacle race series produced by Competitor Group from 1999 to 2013 and was the first major series to introduce mud elements and remove additional equipment. Muddy Buddy was the event format that transitioned adventure racing to obstacle racing as we know it today.

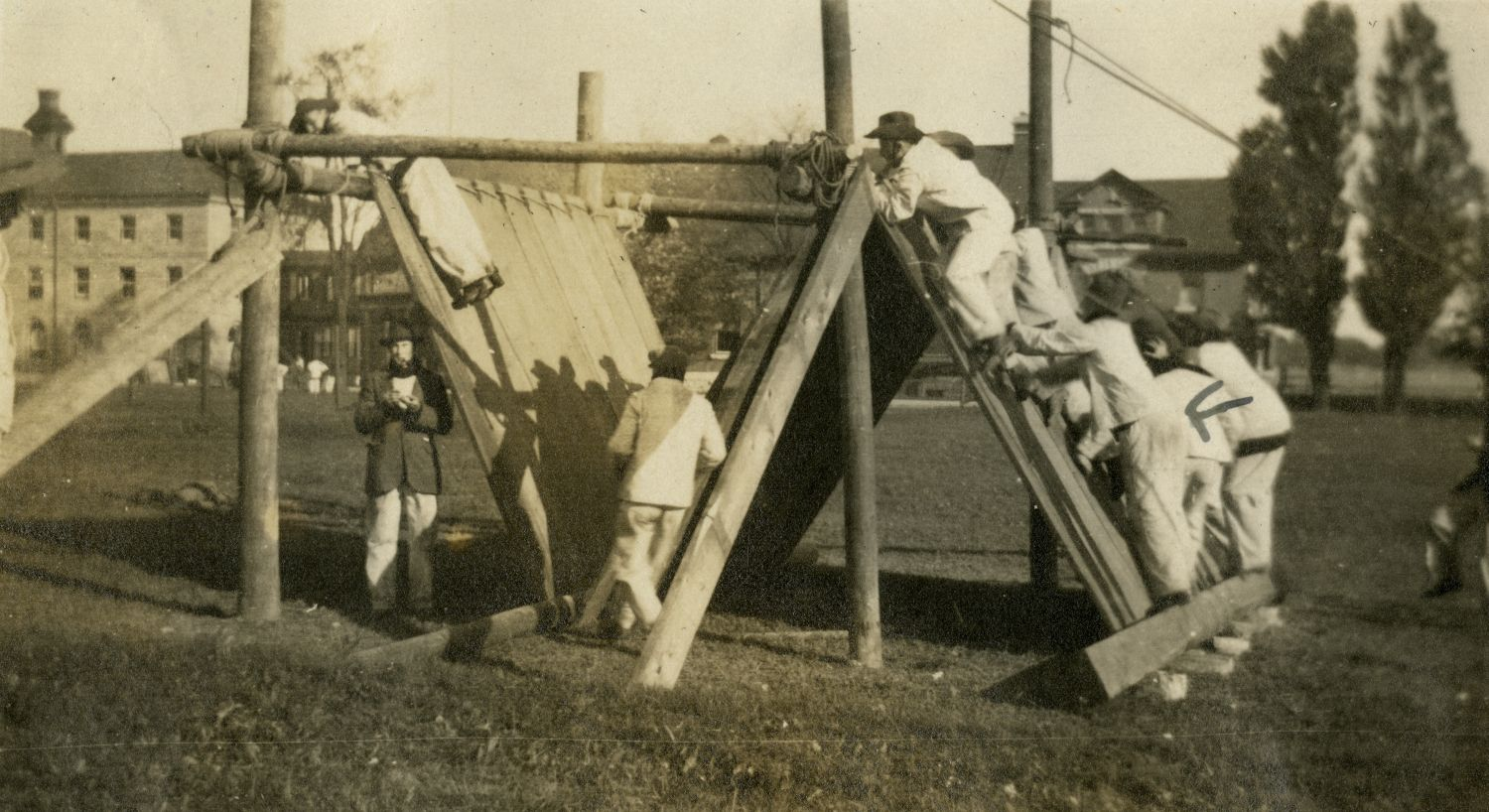
Military obstacle course in Canada c. 1917

=== Development of the sport ===
Spartan Race founder Joe De Sena set a goal to take the sport to the Olympics and tapped event and television producer Ian Adamson for the task in 2014. He subsequently founded the international sporting federation, now known as World Obstacle, the Fédération Internationale de Sport d’Obstacles (FISO), based in Lausanne, Switzerland. World Obstacle is a non-profit, member-based sporting organization and the sole world governing body for Obstacle Course Racing. As of 2022, World Obstacle had national member federations in 115 countries in four continental regions (Africa, Americas, Asia-Pacific, and Europe), the largest number being in Europe. World Obstacle applied for membership of GAISF in 2017, with a goal of having obstacle course racing and related disciplines recognized as an international sport by the International Olympic Committee.

It has been noted that World Obstacle has no member race organizations. As a not-for-profit sporting federation the only members of World Obstacle are national federations (national governing bodies.) The members of the national federations are athletes and athlete-based organizations. Brands and for-profit corporations are not members of sporting federations but can be recognized or aligned under certain circumstances.

In 2017, the UIPM (modern pentathlon) tested a laser-run course with obstacles and made an unsuccessful application to add it as a mixed team medal event for the 2020 Summer Olympics.

Full medal events for OCR were included for the first time in an International Multisport Games in the 2019 South East Asia Games. Medal events were approved for 100 m, 400 m, and 5 km distances. The SEA Games are under the regulation of the Southeast Asian Games Federation (SEAGF) with supervision by the International Olympic Committee (IOC) and the Olympic Council of Asia (OCA).

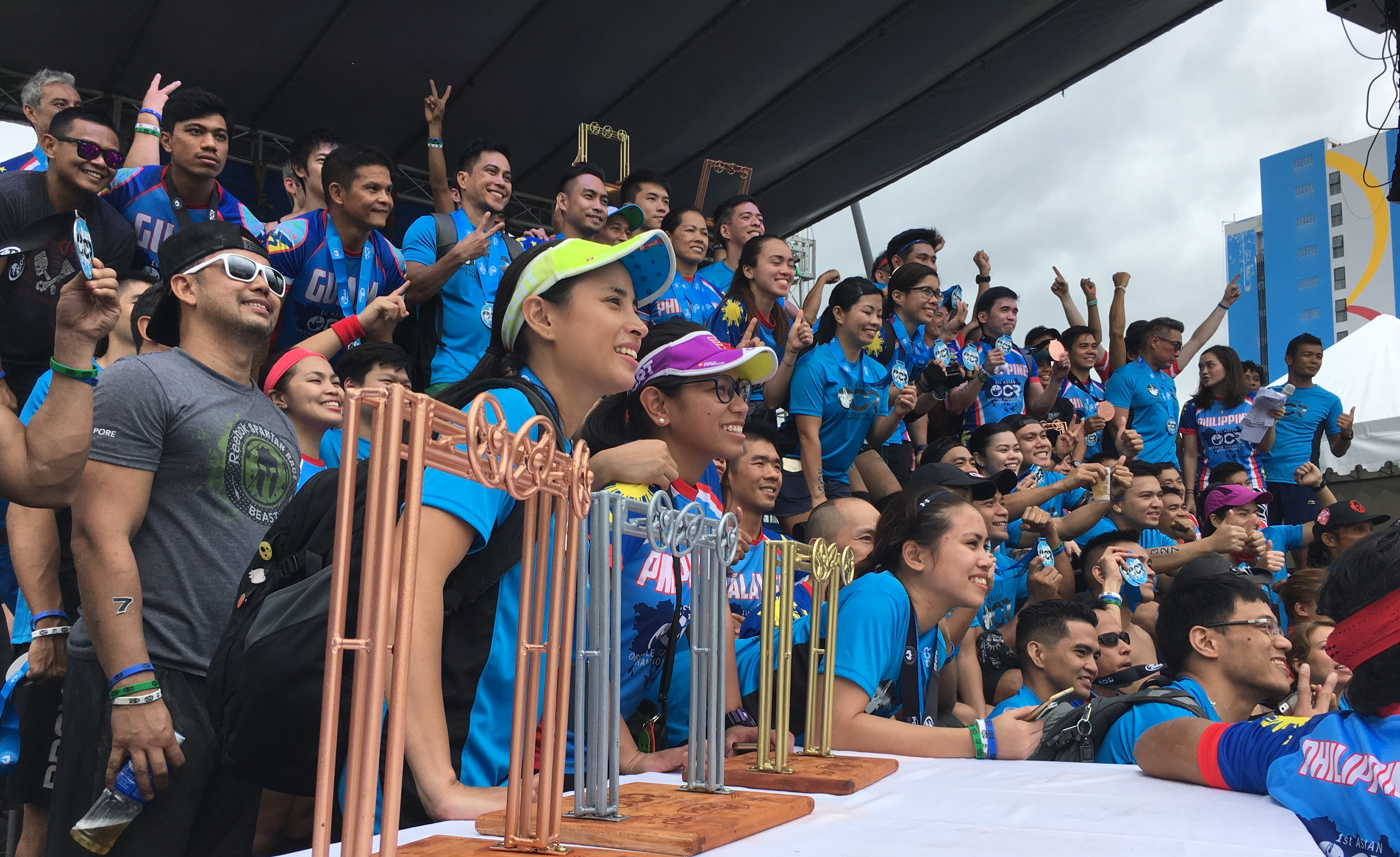
OCR Asian Championship Podium

The sport disciplines of Ninja (modeled after the Japanese television series Sasuke and international adaptations such as American Ninja Warrior) and OCR became self-governing sub-sports of World Obstacle in 2020, in a model similar to Aquatics. The first non-commercial (Federation) Ninja World Championships were held in Moscow, Russia in the 2019 Ninja World Championships.

In August 2020 World Obstacle and the International Parkour Federation signed a memorandum of understanding to unify Obstacle Sports worldwide under a governance model similar to Aquatics (FINA). The MOU expired at the end of 2020. IPF had signed an MOU with Gymnastics (FIG) in January 2018, but were unable to come to an agreement and the term expired.

The OCR 100m international standard format (used in the SEA Games) was first presented in Europe at OCR Polska's 2020 Polish Championships.

== Types ==
=== Ninja ===
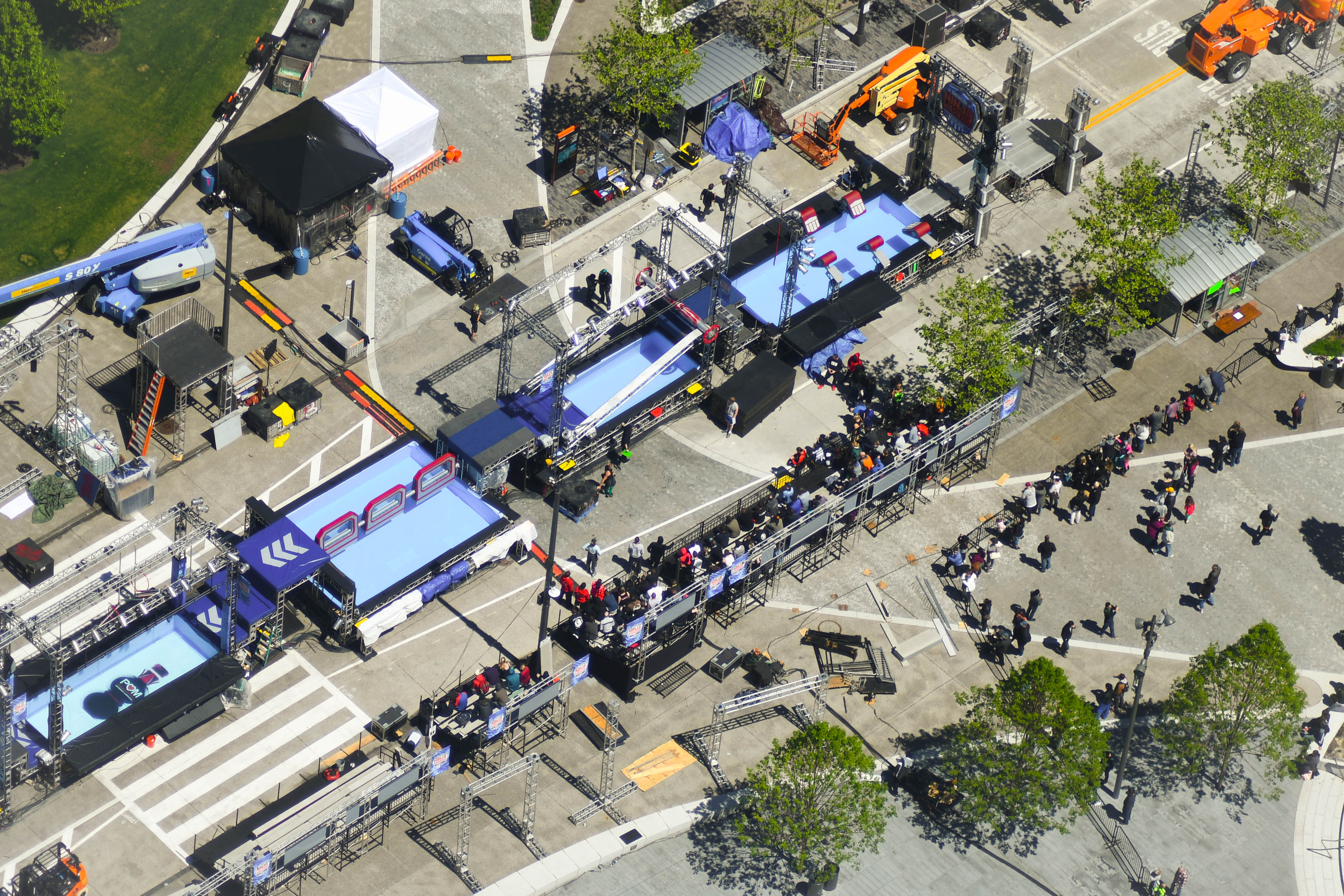
American Ninja Warrior course at Cleveland Public Square

Ninja is a form of obstacle course racing inspired by the Ninja Warrior reality TV shows. The defining characteristic of ninja is that athletes attempt to complete all of the obstacles in a predetermined order consecutively without any significant distance running in between. In a typical competition, athletes do not know what obstacles they will face until right before the competition and they rarely get to test them before they compete. This requires the athlete to focus on a number of different skills and quickly adapt to new concepts, as many obstacles are brand new to the competitors. A common obstacle is the warped wall.

The scoring rules for the sport vary between different leagues that can be regional, national, or international. Two of the largest and most established leagues are the Ultimate Ninja Athlete Association and the World Ninja League, both started in 2015. Some rule sets that are more forgiving provide one or more points for completing an obstacle or progressing to a certain point on an obstacle. Others make athletes retry an obstacle that they miss. Most courses have a time limit between 1 and 5 minutes, though "endurance" courses (often an additional stage in a multi-stage event) can go longer.

Ninja competitions generally take place at dedicated training facilities, some of which are owned by competitors who started on American Ninja Warrior.

Ninja-style obstacle course racing is expected to be a component of the modern pentathlon at the 2028 Summer Olympics.

=== Long-distance race ===
The long-distance obstacle course race has many participants racing each other on a course several kilometers in length. Common obstacles include climbing ropes, carrying sandbags, or crawling under barbed wire.

== Notable events ==
=== Tough Guy ===
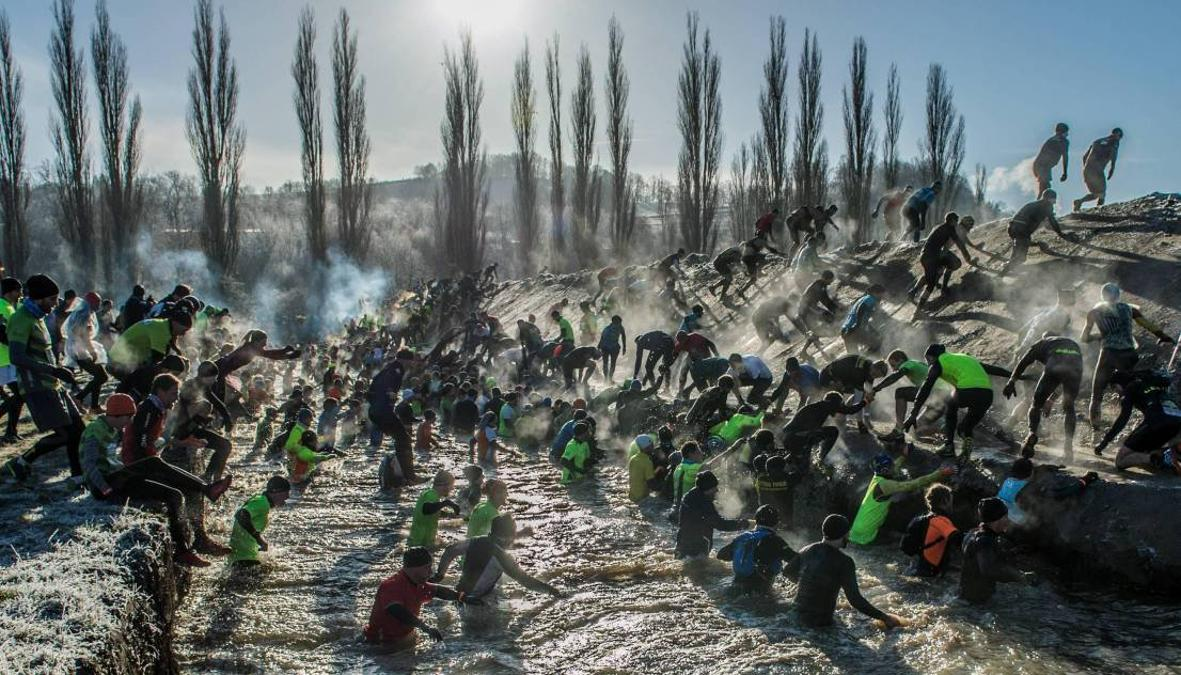
Icy watermoat at Getting Tough - The Race

First staged in 1987, Tough Guy claims to be the first official and toughest obstacle course race in the world. It is held on the last Sunday in January in Perton, Staffordshire, UK. The race is held twice a year in winter and summer. The winter event requires competitors to compete in near freezing temperatures and contend with ice and snow. The 2013 event was won by Knut Höhler.

=== Muddy Buddy ===
Muddy Buddy (1999 - 2010) was the first national OCR series in the United States emphasizing man made obstacles and mud. Unlike later OCRs it included a bike leg, making it a "ride and run" OCR. The event series was produced by Competitor Group and sponsored by Columbia in later years. Muddy Buddy ultimately went out of business under pressure from Tough Mudder and Warrior Dash which had simpler run-obstacle formats.

=== Rugged Maniac ===
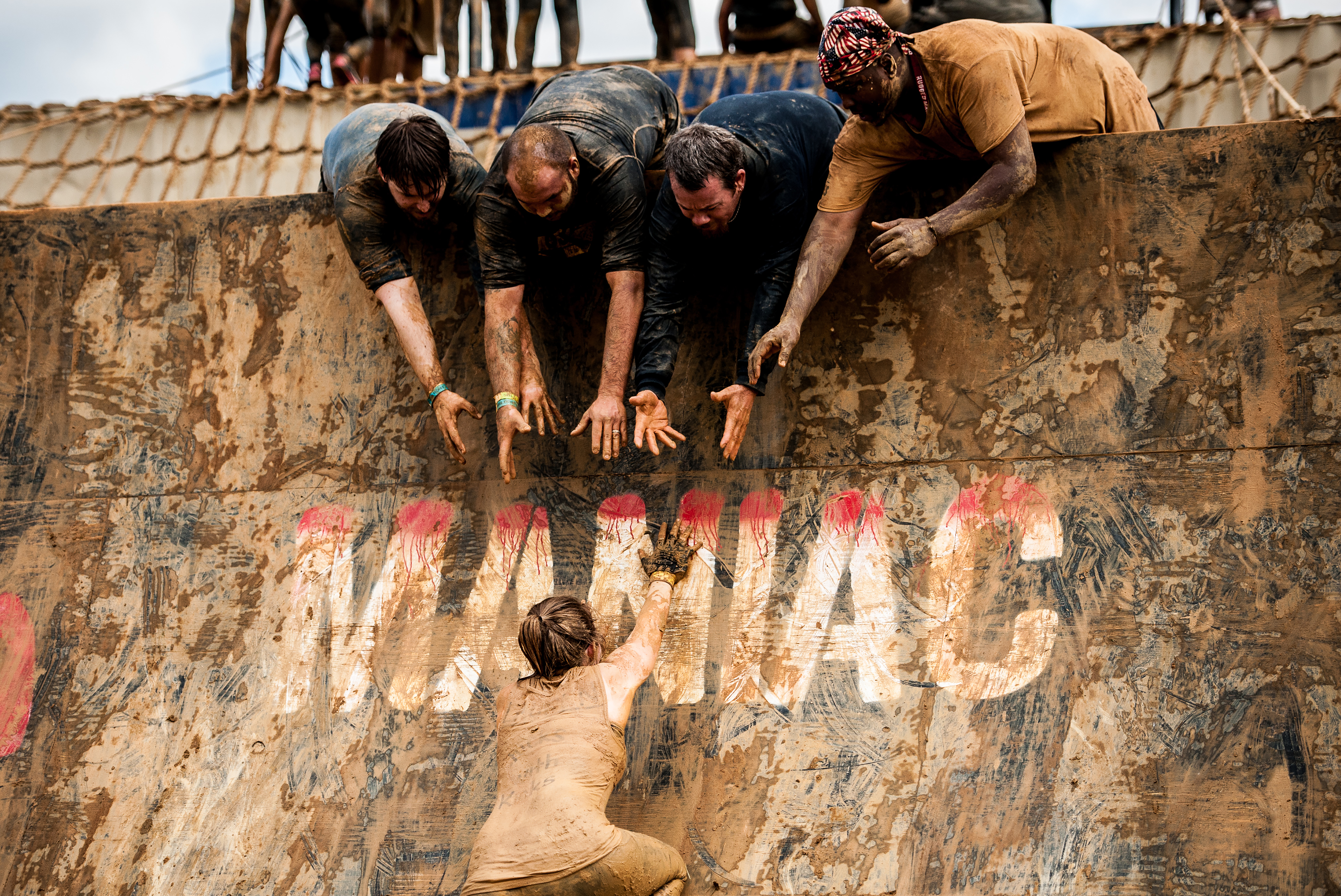
Rugged Maniac 2015. Four men offer a helping hand up the Warped Wall in Rugged Maniac.

Rugged Maniac was founded in 2010 by former lawyers Brad Scudder and Rob Dickens. The very first race was held in October 2010, in Southwick, Massachusetts. It has since expanded to 24 cities over the United States and Canada.

In 2014, they were featured on ABC's Shark Tank and secured a $1.75 million deal with Mark Cuban, the billionaire entrepreneur and owner of the Dallas Mavericks. On January 16, 2016, Rugged Maniac (Under their company name Rugged Races LLC), appeared again on Shark Tank in an update video. Since first appearing on the show, the Rugged Maniac event has expanded to Canada, increased in sales from $4.2 million to $10.5 million before and after Shark Tank, expanded to 28 cities, and created a second race called "The Costume Dash 5K", which debuted in Boston in October 2015.

Rugged Maniac features 25 obstacles over a 5 kilometer (3.1 mile) course. It is designed to be more family-friendly and catered to people of all fitness levels, due to the shorter distance but larger number of obstacles. The run ends with an all-day festival of beer, food, mechanical bull riding, adult-sized bounce houses, and sponsor exhibition booths.

=== Devils Circuit ===
Launched in 2012, Devils Circuit is one of India's earliest and largest obstacle course racing (OCR) events. It consists of 15 military-style obstacles in a 5-km course. Events are held across major Indian cities and feature competitive as well as non-competitive waves, attracting thousands of amateur and elite participants annually. Devils Circuit is credited with popularizing OCR in India and has also partnered with social groups and corporate brands to drive participation and fitness awareness.

=== Spartan Race ===
Spartan Race (2010) was an outgrowth of the annual Death Race (started in 2005), with courses vary in distance and difficulty from "Sprint" courses (3+ miles with 20+ obstacles ), to "Super" (8+ mile with 20+ obstacles), and "Beast" course (13+ mile with 30-35+ obstacles). For endurance enthusiasts, Spartan also offers the "Ultra Beast" which is 2 times through the "Beast" course (later changed to "Ultra" for 30 miles), and the "Hurricane Heat" which involves tasks that set up the obstacle course the night before. Average finishing times for the events range from 30 minutes to 6 hours, depending on the particular course and fitness level of the racer. Race venues are located around the world and have included ski slopes, state parks, paintball parks, and more. Any competitor who completes a Sprint, Super, and Beast in one calendar year (Jan. 1 - Dec. 31) is said to have completed the Spartan Trifecta. In the US, the Spartan Race World Championship was held in Killington, Vermont from 2012 until 2015 when it was moved to Squaw Valley near Lake Tahoe. The World Championship has been held in Squaw Valley in Olympic Valley, CA near Lake Tahoe every year since 2015. Prizes for World Championships in 2016 included: Overall Champions (Men' and Women's) 1st place $15,000, 2nd place $10,000, 3rd place $5,000, 4th place $4,000, 5th place $3,000; Elite Beast Championship (Men & Women's – 40+) 1st place $500, 2nd place $200, 3rd place $100; and Elite Ultra Beast Championship (Men & Women's) 1st place $1,000; 2nd place $500; 3rd place $250; 4th place $100; 5th place $100.

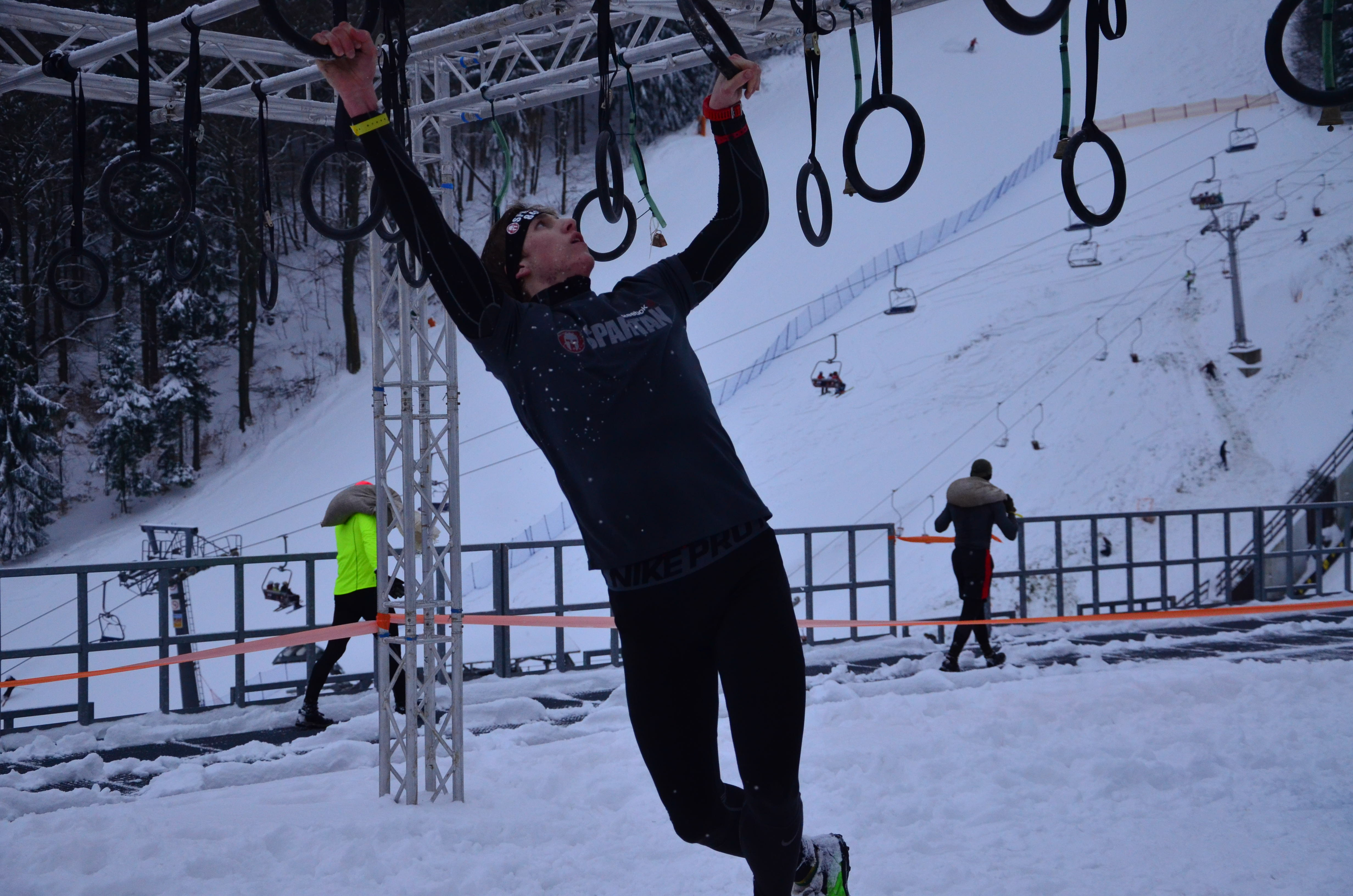
Spartan Winter Race

The first Spartan Race World Championship was held in December 2011 in Glen Rose, Texas as an eight-mile Spartan Race course comprising 36 obstacles and included a US$20,000 prize purse. Beginning in 2012, the Spartan Race World Championships were held annually in Killington, Vermont, and at Squaw Valley, CA since 2015 with a total of $500,000 in cash and prizes.

Spartan Races have occurred in more than 30 other countries around the world. According to event organizers, obstacles vary from race to race. Obstacles during a Spartan Race can include climbing under barbed wire, wall climbing, mud crawling, a javelin throw, a rope climb, heavy object carries, slippery walls, a zig-zag log jump, steep mud climbs, tire flips, and rope swings.

Spartan Races hosted the Kids World Championship which was held on November 17, 2018. Boys and girls between the ages of 10 and 13 from around the world participated in the race.

=== Tough Mudder ===
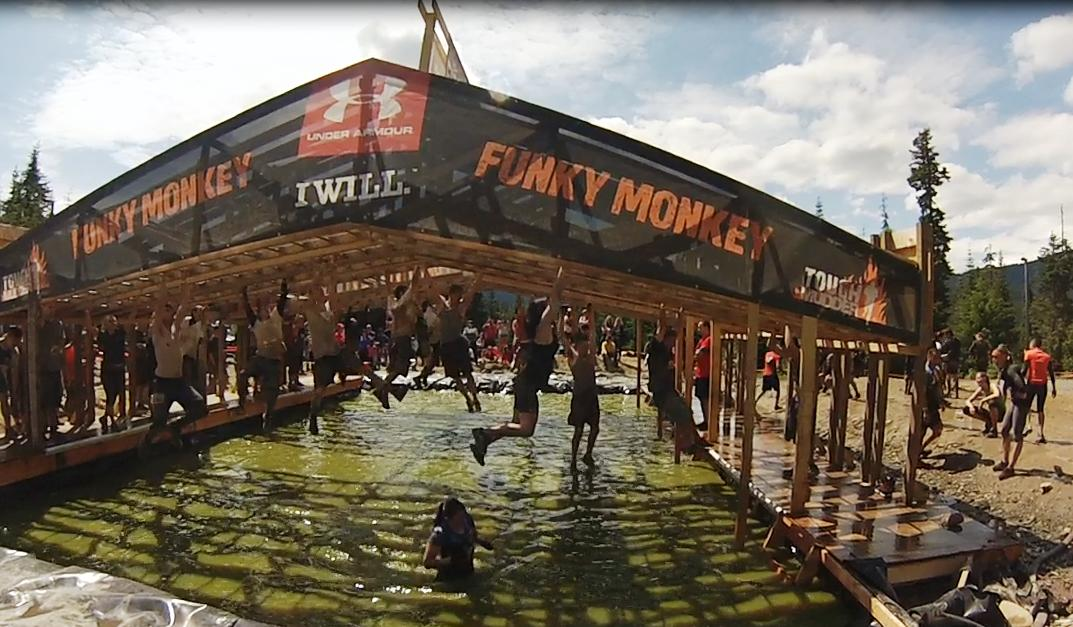
Tough Mudder Funky Monkey

Tough Mudder's first event was held in May 2010. The Tough Mudder is not technically a race and is instead focused on teamwork and completion of the event rather than finishing under a certain time.

Tough Mudder courses are between 10 and 12 miles and contain various military-style obstacles.

The final event of the Tough Mudder season is the World's Toughest Mudder. This is a 24-hour event in which competitors will run a shorter Tough Mudder course that has much more intense obstacles than a normal Tough Mudder and is designed to be more grueling as well. The goal for a participant in World's Toughest Mudder is to complete as many laps as possible within a 24 hours period. The athletes (solo male, solo female, team) who complete the most laps are declared the World's Toughest Mudder. The top male and female each receive $10,000 and the top team receives $12,000 (total).

=== Warrior Dash ===
The Warrior Dash was founded in 2009. Because Warrior Dash does not assign penalties for skipped obstacles, it is often considered an obstacle course event rather than a race. While Warrior Dash does not meet all the requirements to be considered a race, organizers do award their top finishers with non-cash prizes. All finishers receive a "warrior helmet" – a horned helmet.

As a shorter event, winning times for a Warrior Dash may be as short as 15 minutes. While Warrior Dash features many of the same obstacles found at other races such as mud crawls, water features, and cargo net climbs.

It was announced on July 31, 2019, that Red Frog Promotions would be shutting down their operations including Warrior Dash. Spartan Race purchased some of their assets, and instead of refunds for future events, Spartan would provide a replacement entry.

=== Chakravyuh Challenge ===
Founded in 2016 and named after the near-invincible battle formation from Indian mythology (Chakravyuha), the Chakravyuh Challenge is the first obstacle course race to be hosted in the state of Kerala in India. The competition tests the participants' agility, bravery and problem-solving capability by pitting them against obstacles involving slush, water, ropes, inclined slopes, team-building exercises, fun mazes, and more.

The race is open to both men and women and held in three variations - Individual Competitive Category, Team Challenge, and Fun Run. With separate cash prizes awarded to the male and female winners of the first two categories. The obstacle race is part of a three-day adventure fest, held annually and the circuit itself is designed every year by former Indian Navy commandos.

=== Adventurey OCR World Championships ===
The self-named independent World Championship is an event owned and operated by Adventurey, a Brooklyn NY marketing and branding company. The first race took place on October 25 & 26, 2014 in Cincinnati, Ohio. The men's event was won by UK's Jonathan Albon, who successfully defended his crown in 2015 and 2016. and every consecutive year through the current 2019 season. For the women, the inaugural event was won by Siri Englund of Sweden in 2014 and then Lindsay Webster of Canada in 2015 and 2016. With participation of the sport growing, the organization added a 3 km course and a team event in 2016.

=== Modern pentathlon ===
Obstacle racing as part of 2026 Modern Pentathlon World Championship

In 2021, the Union Internationale de Pentathlon Moderne (UIPM) announced that it had approved proposals to replace show jumping as one of the five disciplines that comprises the modern pentathlon, amid criticism stemming from animal welfare incidents that occurred during the modern pentathlon events at the 2020 Summer Olympics. In May 2022, the UIPM announced plans to hold test events alongside the Modern Pentathlon World Cup final in Ankara, Turkey, in cooperation with World Obstacle. At its Congress in November 2022, the UIPM voted 69–11 to approve the replacement of show jumping with ninja-style obstacle course racing; if approved by the IOC, this change would take effect at the Olympic level at the 2028 Summer Olympics.

== See also ==
- Parkour
- World Chase Tag
