= List of obstacle course racing events =

The following is a list of Obstacle course racing (OCR) events/series across the world.

Name	Country	First event	Final event	Ref
Battlefrog	United States	2014	2016	
Bog Commander	United Kingdom	2014	Ongoing	
Bonefrog	United States	2013	Ongoing	
Carrera Sucia	Argentina	2012		
Chakravyuh Challenge	India	2016		
Getting Tough	Germany	2011	Ongoing	
IMPI Challenge	South Africa	2009	Ongoing	
Legion Run	Cyprus	2013	Ongoing	
Mud Masters	Netherlands Germany	2012	Ongoing	
Muddy Buddy	United States	1999	2010	
Nuclear Races	United Kingdom		Ongoing	
OCR World Championships	United States	2014	Ongoing	
ROC Obstacle Course	Argentina		Ongoing	
Rough Runner	United Kingdom	2015	Ongoing	
Rugged Maniac	United States	2010	2023	
Savage Race	United States	2011	Ongoing	
Spartan Race	United States	2010	Ongoing	
Strong Viking	Netherlands	2013	Ongoing	
The Suffering Race	United Kingdom	2012	2017	
Terrain Race	United States		Ongoing	
Tough Guy	United Kingdom	1987		
Tough Mudder	United States	2010	Ongoing	
Toughest	Sweden		Ongoing	
Warrior Dash	United States	2009	2019	
Warrior Race	South Africa	2013	Ongoing	
World Famous Mud Run	United States	1993	Ongoing	
Gladiator Race	Czech Republic	2014	Ongoing	
