= Superhero Scramble =

Series of obstacle racing events

- Genre: Obstacle Race
- Location: United States
- Inaugurated: 2011
- Most recent: July 28, 2012
- Website: superheroscramble.com

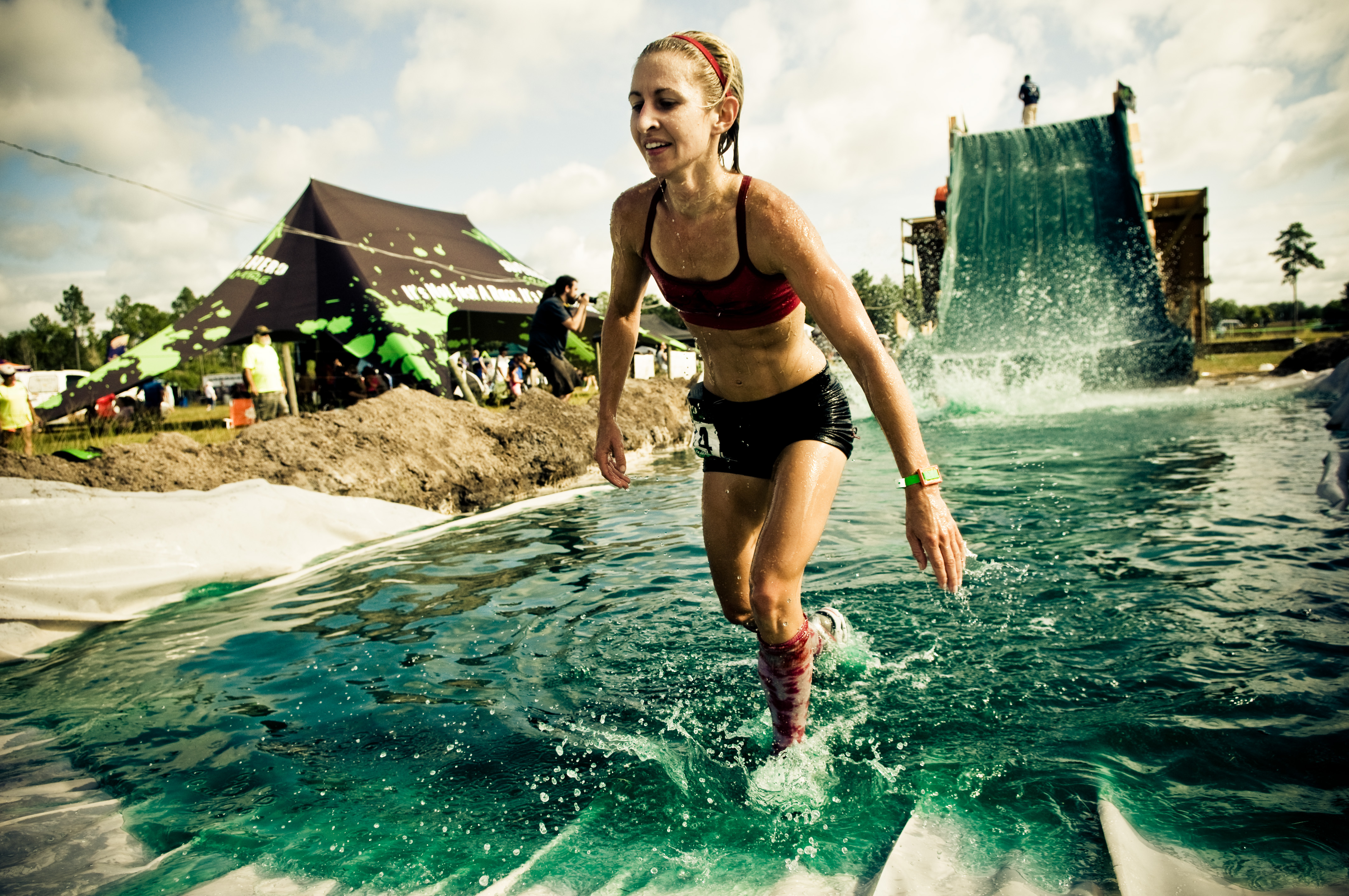
A participant exiting the Super Slime Slide

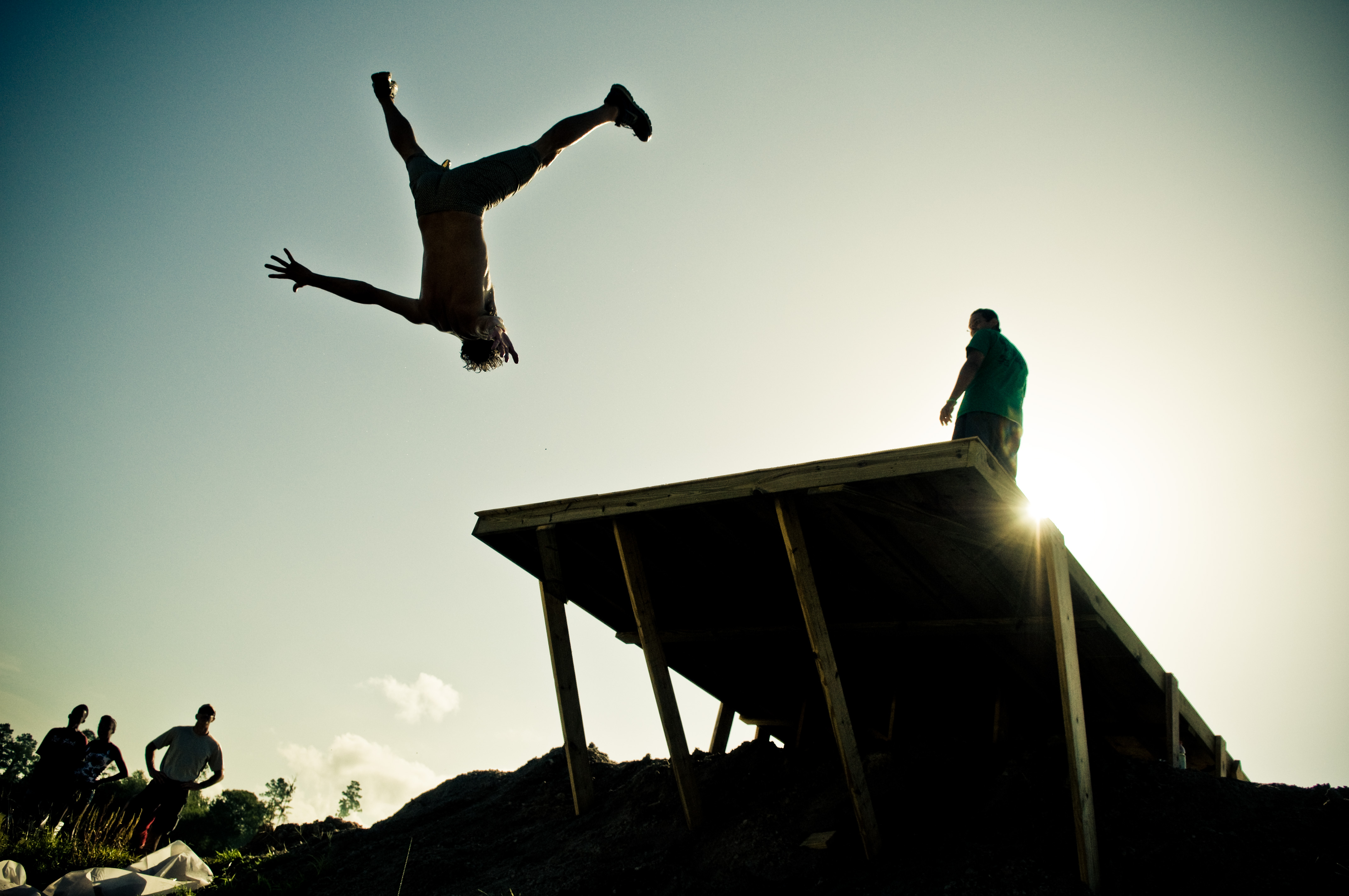
A participant flips off of the Leap of Faith jump

Superhero Scramble was a superhero themed obstacle race series that has several levels of races. The majority of participants participate for fun, while others compete for team and individual prize money that's available at each event. Participants frequently dress in costumes based on characters from video games, movies, cartoons, and comic books. The all-day events included live bands, DJ's, emcees, entertainers, food and beer. There were also night races and kids' races.

== History ==
The Superhero Scramble was founded in June 2011, in Boca Raton, Florida by Sean O'Connor. The first event occurred on November 12, 2011, at Quiet Waters Park in Deerfield Beach, and attracted nearly 2,000 people. Three more events took place in Florida during the next twelve months, and subsequently the group has organized national level events across the US. Men and women participate about equally in the races, and both young and older adults take part.

After 2013, the Superhero Scramble, as well as several other obstacle races, had some financial trouble because fewer people were signing up to participate. The final races were plagued with low volunteer and support turnout, and the remaining scheduled races were canceled. Participants were not given refunds.

== Course ==
Superhero Scramble racecourses vary in distance and difficulty from four mile "Charger" courses to eight mile "Intimidator" courses, as well as thirteen mile (half marathon) "Villain" and the 26 mile (marathon) "Super Villain." Projected finishing times for the events range from 30 minutes to 12 hours, depending on the particular course and fitness level of the racer. Race venues have included ski slopes, state parks, paint ball parks, off-road parks, and more. Any competitor who completes all three race distances within a 12-month period is eligible to receive special designation as a "Superhero Legend."

== Obstacles ==
The Superhero Scramble races include a variety of obstacles including the Leap of Faith jump, The Beast climbing wall, the Spiderweb ropes course, the Real Barbed Wire, the Top of the World Container Crossing, the Dumpster Divin ice bath, the Super Slime Slide and several mud slides.

=== Scramble Gamble ===
The Scramble Gamble allows participants to win a cash prize whereby half the entrance fees are given to charity and the remaining half split between the top 3 finishers.

== Charitable Partnership ==
Superhero Scramble supports Forgotten Soldiers Outreach (FSO), which was founded in 2003 to send monthly "We Care" packages to U.S. servicemen and servicewomen abroad. To date, FSO has benefited over 250,000 military personnel serving abroad, covering ALL world theaters.

== Night Waves ==
In July 2012 in Waldo, Fl, Superhero Scramble held its first night waves. Races where participants ran the same course that was set up during the day, navigating by way of the moonlight and their headlamps.

== Super Kids Race ==
Kids can run their own version of the Superhero Scramble. The course is estimated to be 1 mile long and with 5 or more obstacles. Age groups of 4-8 and 9-13 run together. Parents are encouraged to run with their children. Participants receive a medal, a sticker and a temporary tattoo.

== Past events ==
Date	Location	City
November 2, 2011	Quiet Waters Park	Deerfield Beach, FL
March 12, 2012	Oleta River State Park	Miami, FL
July 28, 2012	Waldo Motorsports Park	Waldo, FL
January 12, 2013	Emilia Earhart State Park	Miami, FL
April 27, 2013	Redwine’s Cove – The Medusa	Dalton, GA
June, 2013	Amesbury Sports Park	Amesbury, MA
August, 2013	Tuxedo Ridge Ski Center	Tuxedo, NY

== See also ==
- Hobie Call
- Obstacle Racing
- Tough Mudder
- Spartan Race
- Warrior Dash
