= DeSena =

DeSena or De Sena is a surname. Notable people with the surname include:

- Jack DeSena (born 1987), American actor and comedian
- Jennifer DeSena (born 1969), American attorney and politician
- Joe De Sena (born 1969), CEO and founder of Spartan and the Death Race
