= Hobin =

Hobin is a surname. Notable people with the surname include:

- Donna Hobin (born 1956), a Canadian basketball player
- Eric Hobin (fl. 2004–2007), an English politician
- Jonathan Hobin (born 1979), a Canadian photographer
- Mike Hobin (born 1954) was a Canadian ice hockey player

== See also ==
- Hobie
