= Hobie Call =

American obstacle course racer

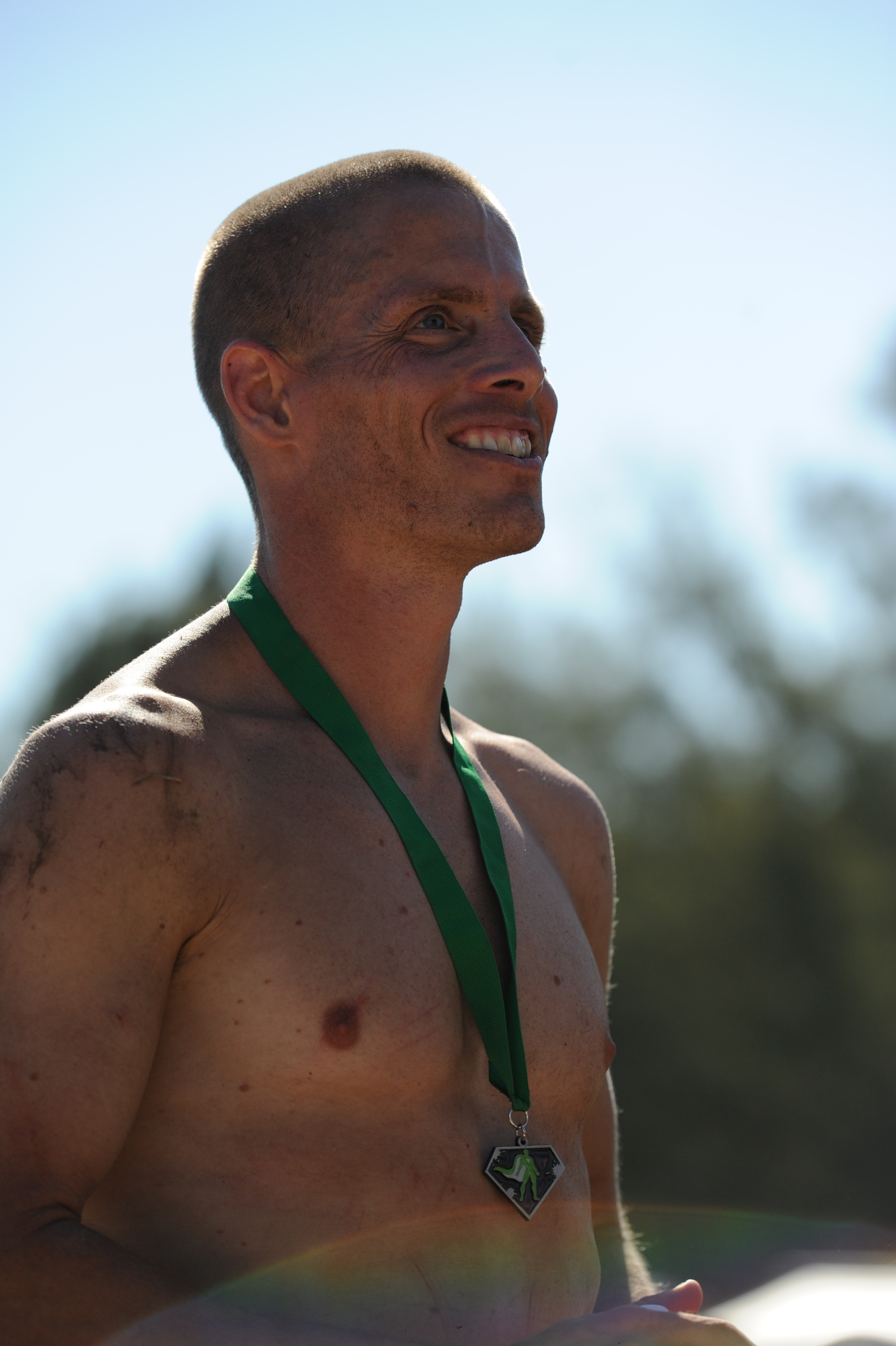
Hobie Call at the SUPERHERO SCRAMBLE race in Miami, FL at Oleta River State Park, March 24, 2012

Holbrook "Hobie" Call (born 1977) is an American former competitive runner and elite obstacle course racer. Call is a multiple-time winner of the Spartan Race, an obstacle race with challenges similar to those found in the television program American Gladiators.

A native of Utah, he is the father of five children.

Call won the Scramble Gamble at the Superhero Scramble race in Miami, FL on March 12, 2012. He finished first with a time of 33:29 and won a cash purse of $2,000. Call also ran in and won the Scramble Gamble race in Waldo, FL on July 28, 2012, with a finishing time of 27:05. Since, Call has won many Superhero Scrambles.

Call took the first win of the Spartan Race season in Southern California. He finished the 8 mile course in under an hour.

He was 2nd place male at the 2012 Spartan Race Championships at Killington, VT and the first place male competitor at the 2013 Spartan Race Championship at Killington, VT.

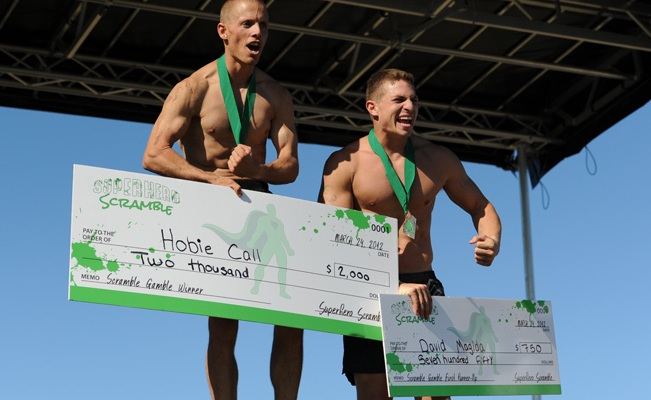
Hobie Call on the podium as winner of the Scramble Gamble in Miami, FL March 24, 2012

Call also participated in Episode 44, 47, and 50 of the OCR Warrior TV Show.

Call announced his retirement from competitive obstacle course racing in 2015, but joined the Spartan Race Pro-Team for 2017. During the announcement, he stated it would be his last year of competitive racing.

In 2012, Hall publicly claimed that he would be able to run a sub-2:00 marathon (which would be a world record), despite a personal best of only 2:16 on a net downhill course. His responses to follow-up interviews, who cited his lack of elite road performances and the difficulty of breaking a world record, were described as "defensive" and "borderline neurotic". As of 2024, Call has never improved on his previous best of 2:16.

== Running Race Results ==
Race	Date	Overall Finish	Time
Pikes Peak Half Marathon	Aug. 17, 1996	5	2:31:09
Pikes Peak Half Marathon	Aug. 17, 1997	8	2:32:27
Spectrum 10K	Mar. 11, 2000	1	0:30:50
St. George Marathon	July 24, 2002	3	2:25:07
Deseret Morning News 10K	July 24, 2002	5	0:29:41
Top of Utah Marathon	Sept. 21, 2002	1	2:25:13
Painters Half Marathon	Jan. 14, 2006	1	1:14:12
Salt Lake City Marathon and Half Marathon	June 3, 2006	4	2:24:06
Salt Lake City Marathon	April 21, 2007	2	2:23:06
Sandy Classic 10K	July 4, 2007	1	0:31:33
Bryce Canyon Half-Marathon	July 21, 2007	1	1:04:00
Pikes Peak Half Marathon	Aug. 19, 2007	2	2:15:12

== Obstacle Course Racing Results ==
Race	Date	Overall Finish	Time
Spartan Super SoCal	Feb. 26, 2011	1	57:51
Super Spartan Phoenix	Mar. 12, 2011	1	51:20
Spartan Sprint Texas	Mar. 26, 2011	1	28:13
Super Spartan Florida	Apr. 23, 2011	1	59:14
Spartan Sprint Georgia	Apr. 30, 2011	1	34:23
Spartan Sprint New York	June 4, 2011	1	39:58
Super Spartan Utah	July 9, 2011	1	1:08:22
Spartan Beast 2011	Aug. 6, 2011	10	3:18:13
Spartan Sprint Massachusetts	Aug. 27, 2011	1	35:07
Super Spartan Pennsylvania	Sept. 10, 2011	1	50:23
Super Spartan Staten Island	Sept. 24, 2011	1	56:03
Spartan Sprint Illinois	Oct. 15, 2011	1	40:46
Spartan Sprint Malibu	Nov. 19, 2011	1	27:52
Texas Super Spartan	Dec. 3, 2011	1	1:07:11
SoCal Super Spartan	Jan. 28, 2012	1	1:23:20
Arizona Super Spartan	Feb. 11, 2012	81	1:37:51 *while tethered to his wife (Irene Call).
Florida Super Spartan	Feb. 25, 2012	1	1:08:27
Georgia Spartan Sprint	Mar. 10, 2012	1	41:41
Superhero Scramble Miami	Mar. 24, 2012	1	33:29
Colorado Military Spartan Sprint	May 5, 2012	1	53:00
Texas Spartan Sprint	May 19, 2012	1	44:52
Tri-State NY Spartan Sprint	June 2, 2012	1	44:42
Pacific NW Spartan Sprint	June 16, 2012	1	26:58
Utah Spartan Beast	June 30, 2012	1	1:26:14
Pennsylvania Spartan Sprint	July 14, 2012	1	59:12
Superhero Scramble North Florida	July 28, 2012	1	27:05
Mid-Atlantic Super Spartan	Aug. 25, 2012	1	1:16:13
Vermont Spartan Championship 2012	Sept. 22, 2012	2	2:50:20
Sacramento Spartan Beast	Nov. 17, 2012	1	1:38:55
Malibu Spartan Sprint	Dec. 1, 2012	1	26:42
Texas Spartan Beast	Dec. 8, 2012	1	1:43:37
SoCal Spartan Sprint	Jan. 26, 2013	1	1:13:20
Arizona Spartan Sprint	Feb. 9, 2013	1	39:12
Georgia Spartan Sprint	Mar. 9, 2013	1	35:15
Nevada Super Spartan	Apr. 6, 2013	1	1:04:10
Superhero Scramble Charger Georgia	Apr. 27, 2013	1	34:47
Superhero Scramble Intimidator Central Florida	May 25, 2013	2	1:03:07
Superhero Scramble Charger New England	June 8, 2013	1	35:14
Utah Spartan Beast	June 29, 2013	1	1:29:00
Pacific NW Spartan Sprint	Aug. 3, 2013	1	33:54
Monterey Spartan Beast	Aug. 10, 2013	1	1:47:55
Virginia Super Spartan	Aug. 24, 2013	2	1:55:51
Vermont Spartan World Championship Beast	Sept. 21, 2013	1	3:35:57
Malibu Spartan Sprint	Dec. 7, 2013	2	29:52
Superhero Scramble World Championship	Jan. 11, 2014	1	1:09:58
SoCal Spartan Super	Jan. 25, 2014	1	1:09:01
Atlas Race SoCal	Feb. 22, 2014	11	50:04
Austin Spartan Super	May 17, 2014	2	1:08:09
BattleFrog Atlanta	May 31, 2014	1	52:16
Utah Spartan Beast	June 28, 2014	7	2:03:02
BattleFrog 15K	Aug. 4, 2014	1	1:02:15
Warrior Dash Oregon	Oct. 6, 2014	3	
Warrior Dash NorCal	Oct. 18, 2014	2	23:25
OCR World Championships	Oct. 25, 2014	3	1:25:58
Atlas Race SoCal	Feb. 28, 2015	2	36:45
BattleFrog Houston	Mar. 28, 2015	2	1:32:35
BattleFrog Dallas	Apr. 11, 2015	2	1:34:22
Breckenridge Spartan Sprint	June 13, 2015	1	49:12
Pennsylvania Spartan Super	July 11, 2015	4	1:40:40
Pacific NW Spartan Sprint	Aug. 8, 2015	3	39:47
Warrior Dash World Championship	Oct. 10, 2015	4	36:03
BattleFrog Salt Lake City	May 14, 2016	1	1:13:29
Utah Spartan Super	Aug. 13, 2016	1	1:10:39
Spartan World Championships	Oct. 1, 2016	1	2:25:33
Arizona Spartan Sprint	Feb. 25, 2017	50	53:54
Miami Spartan Sprint	April 29, 2017	1	27:58
Monterey Spartan Super	June 3, 2017	1	1:08:47
Pennsylvania Spartan Super	July 8, 2017	1	1:37:45
Las Vegas Spartan Super	March 3, 2017	1281	2:25:33

== See also ==
- Spartan Race
- Tough Mudder
- Warrior Dash
