= Mudderella =

Mudderella is a 5-7 mile long obstacle course event series targeted toward women. With 12-15 obstacles, Mudderella courses are designed to test strength and stamina.

== History ==
Mudderella was created in 2013 by Cristina DeVito, who was formerly Chief Strategy Officer at Tough Mudder.

The first Mudderella event was held in Tamiment, Pennsylvania on Saturday, September 21, 2013.

== Event ==
The event begins with a warm-up period called "Stretch + Strengthen." On the course, obstacles include "Hat Trick," where participants trampoline onto a cargo net, climb up and then slide down into a muddy pool. Mudderella events are not timed; the organizers encourage teamwork. Other obstacles include hay bale mountains, stability balls, and water.

After running the course, participants attend a "Rinse + Revive" station, where there are showers, activities and entertainment.

== Charity partnership ==
Mudderella supports Futures Without Violence, a national nonprofit that aims to prevent and end domestic violence by standing with survivors and developing innovative programs and policies that engage new allies as partners in the solution.
