= Hobie =

Hobie is a name or nickname.

== People with the given name ==
- Hobie Call (born 1977), American obstacle course racer
- Hobie Verhulst (born 1993), Dutch professional footballer

== People with the nickname ==
- Hobart Alter (1933–2014), creator of the Hobie Cat catamaran and a founding pioneer in the surfboard shaping industry
- Hobie Billingsley, American diver and coach, member of the International Swimming Hall of Fame
- Gregg "Hobie" Hubbard, keyboard player for Sawyer Brown
- Hobie Harris (born 1993), American baseball player
- Hobie Kitchen (born 1904), Canadian National Hockey League player
- Hobie Landrith (1930-2023), American Major League Baseball catcher
- J-Hope (born 1994), member of the popular K-pop band BTS

== Fictional characters with the name ==
- Hobie Brown, the first Prowler, a Marvel Comics superhero
- Hobie Buchannon, from the TV series Baywatch
- Hobie Doyle, from the Coen Brothers’ movie Hail, Caesar!
- James "Hobie" Hobart, from Donna Tart’s novel The Goldfinch

== See also ==
- Hobey Baker (1892–1918), American hockey and football player, the only person in both the Hockey and College Football Halls of Fame
