= Zuzana Kocumová =

Czech cross-country skier

Personal information
- Nationality: Czech Republic
- Born: May 26, 1979 (age 47)

Sport
- Sport: Skiing

World Cup career
- Seasons: 6 – (1996–2001)
- Indiv. starts: 42
- Indiv. podiums: 0
- Team starts: 6
- Team podiums: 0
- Overall titles: 0 – (36th in 2000)
- Discipline titles: 0
Medal record
Women'scross-country skiing
Representing Czech Republic
Junior World Championships
Gold medal – first place	1999 Saafelden	15 km freestyle
Bronze medal – third place	1998 Pontresina	5 km freestyle

Zuzana Kocumová (born 26 May 1979) is a Czech cross-country skier who competed from 1996 to 2001. At the 1998 Winter Olympics in Nagano, she finished sixth in the 4 × 5 km relay, 35th in the 30 km event, 41st in the 5 km + 10 km combined pursuit and 59th in the 5 km event.

Kocumová's best result at the FIS Nordic World Ski Championships was 23rd twice (1997: 5 km + 10 km combined pursuit, 2001: 15 km). Her best World Cup result was 12th in an individual sprint event in Switzerland in 2000.

Kocumová earned three individual victories at lower-level events up to 15 km from 1998 to 2001.

Kocumova won the female 2015 Spartan World Championships in Lake Tahoe, California.

== Cross-country skiing results ==
All results are sourced from the International Ski Federation (FIS).

=== Olympic Games ===
Year	Age	5 km	15 km	Pursuit	30 km	4 × 5 km relay
1998	18	59	—	41	35	6

=== World Championships ===
Year	Age	5 km	10 km	15 km	Pursuit	30 km	Sprint	4 × 5 km relay
1999	19	45	—N/a	—	27	—	—N/a	7
2001	21	—N/a	—	23	34	CNX^{[a]}	DNS	8

a. ^{1} Cancelled due to extremely cold weather.

=== World Cup ===
==== Season standings ====
Season	Age				
Season	Age	Overall	Long Distance	Middle Distance	Sprint
1996	16	NC	—N/a	—N/a	—N/a
1997	17	68	68	—N/a	—
1998	18	NC	NC	—N/a	—
1999	19	51	48	—N/a	58
2000	20	36	50	28	34
2001	21	46	—N/a	—N/a	28

Awards
Preceded by Hana Pešková	Czech Junior Athlete of the Year; 2003	Succeeded by Lenka Hyková
