= Rugged Maniac =

Annual obstacle course race in Canada and the US

- Rugged Maniac Logo
- Location: 30 Locations United States / Canada
- Event type: Obstacle Racing, Mud Run
- Distance: 5K (3.1 miles)
- Primary sponsor: Men's Health; Women's Health (magazine); Harpoon Brewery; American Cancer Society
- Beneficiary: American Cancer Society
- Established: September 2010
- Course records: Rugged Maniac Results
- Website: www.ruggedmaniac.com
- Participants: 150,000 in 2015

Rugged Maniac, also known as the Mud Run, was an annual obstacle course race, which was hosted in multiple cities across the United States and Canada in 2010-2023. Participants completed a 5-kilometer (3.1-mile) course with obstacles that included muddy water slides, crawling through tunnels, jumping over logs set on fire, and scaling large, curved walls. Billionaire entrepreneur Mark Cuban invested in Rugged Maniac, after meeting them on season 5 of the hit ABC reality show Shark Tank. As of 2024, according to their website, the company has gone out of business.

== History ==
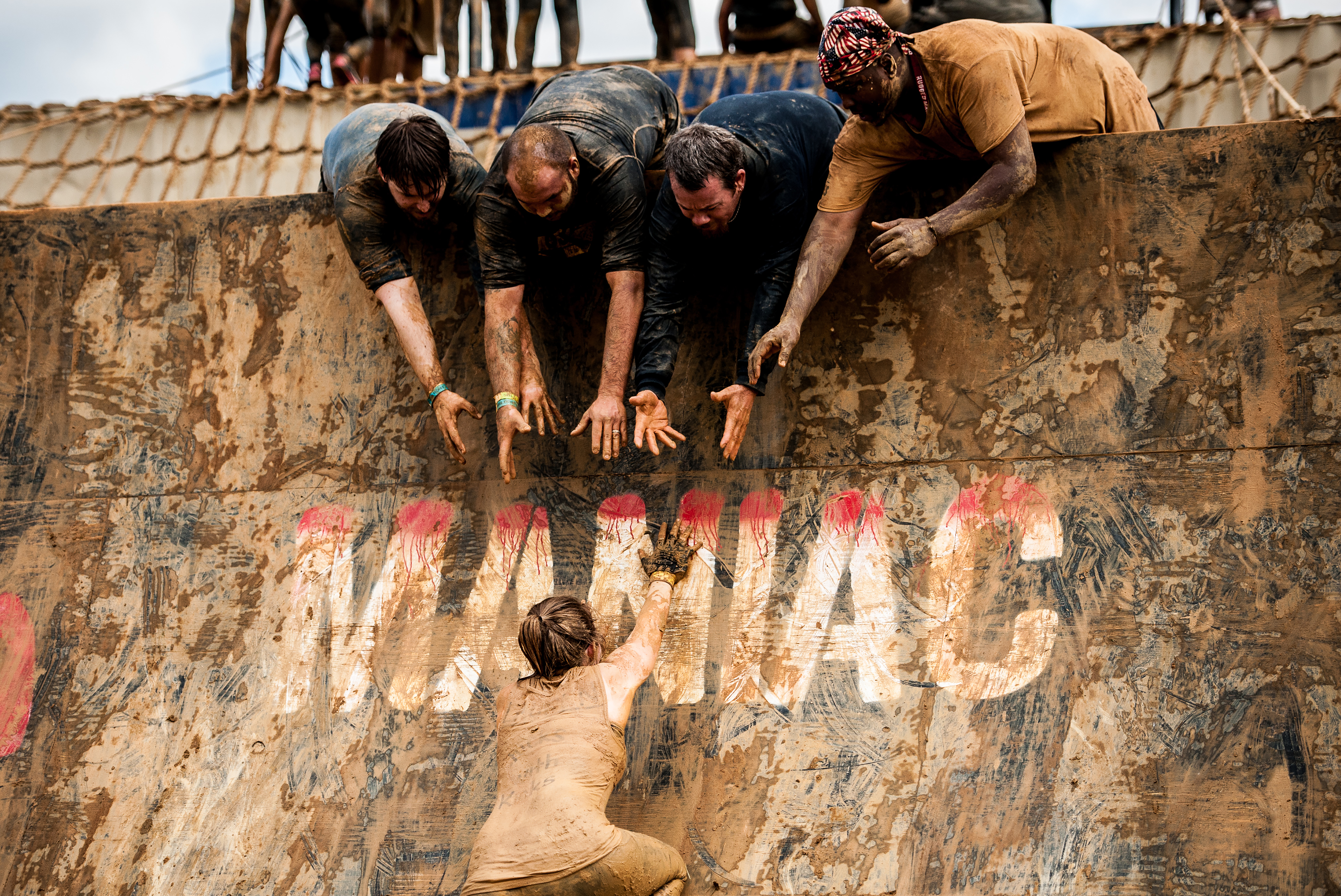
Rugged Maniac, Warped Wall Obstacle, 2014

Rugged Maniac was first established in June 2010 by founder and CEO, Brad Scudder, a former attorney. Rob Dickens, the co-founder and COO, was previously a corporate lawyer on Wall Street at Milbank, Tweed, Hadley & McCloy.

=== 2010: Inaugural Rugged Maniac event in New England ===
In October 2010, the first Rugged Maniac event was held in Southwick, Massachusetts, where they hosted over 2,000 race participants. Scudder used his savings from the past two years as a lawyer to fund the event. The feature race had waves of 330 people every half hour and a festival with music, food and beer for the racers.

The event has since expanded to 30 event days in the United States and Canada. The largest event, held in the inaugural New England location Southwick, MA, boasted approximately 12,000 total race participants in the fall of 2015.

=== 2013: Shark Tank appearance and investment from Mark Cuban ===
Rugged Maniac (under company name Rugged Races LLC) experienced steady growth and in 2013, caught the attention of Shark Tank, a reality television series in which entrepreneurs pitch business ideas to a panel of investors. In September 2013, the producers of Shark Tank contacted Scudder and Dickens to compete in the show. The initial investment they asked for from the Sharks was $1 million for 10% of the company. Eventually they reached a deal with Mark Cuban and settled on a $1.75 million investment for 25% of the business.

On January 16, 2016, Rugged Maniac, appeared again on Shark Tank in an update video. Since first appearing on the show, the Rugged Maniac event has expanded to Canada, increased in sales from $4.2 million to $10.5 million before and after Shark Tank, expanded to 28 cities, and created a second race called "The Costume Dash 5K", which debuted in Boston in October 2015.

Rugged Races LLC has been consistently listed as one of the most successful Shark Tank investment deals in terms of growth and profit margin since airing on the show.

=== 2016: Partnerships with Men's Health, American Cancer Society, and NASCAR ===
In May 2016, American Cancer Society announced an official charity partnership with Rugged Maniac. As an extension of traditional walk or run for cancer events, American Cancer Society and Rugged Maniac have created a fundraising platform in which participants can raise funds exclusively for the society.

In June 2016, Rodale, Inc., the publisher of Men's Health and Women's Health (magazine) announced its partnership with Rugged Races LLC. Specifically, Men's Health magazine would be working to bring in advertising partners for Rugged Maniac, in the form of branded obstacles, such as the 12-foot-tall warped wall. Men's Health had a previous partnership with Urbanathlon but cited their motivation to work with a "bigger and better" brand in running events for their new partnership with Rugged Maniac.

In July 2016, Rugged Maniac was the title sponsor for Joe Gibbs Racing in the NASCAR XFINITY series at Daytona International Speedway. David Ragan was the driver of the #18 Rugged Maniac Toyota Camry, in place of Matt Tifft, who had been scheduled for brain surgery.

== Race event locations ==
Rugged Races is hosting 30 races in the United States and Canada in 2017.

Event	2017 event dates	Current venue	Men's defending champion	Women's defending champion
(United States) South Carolina	March 18	Boone Hall Plantation, Mt Pleasant, SC	Matt Jones	Michelle Marsar
(United States) Phoenix, AZ	April 15 / November 4	Wild Horse Pass Motorsports Park, Chandler, AZ	David Robert	Kashara King
(United States) Florida	April 22	Little Everglades Ranch, Dade City, FL	Seth Rinderknecht	Jamie Styles
(United States) Oklahoma City	April 29	Wake Zone Cable Park, OKC	Brian Pinta	Kaitlyn Bykowick
(United States) Virginia	May 6 / Sept 23	Virginia Motorsports Park, Petersburg, VA	Piotr Dybas	Heather Ferguson
(United States) Los Angeles	May 13	Castaic Lake Recreation Area, Castaic, CA	Veejay Jones	Sasha Souder
(United States) North Carolina	May 20 / Oct 7	Rockingham Dragway, Rockingham, NC	Tony Fleckenstein	Brandy Martin
(United States) Northern California	May 27 / Oct 14	Alameda County Fairgrounds, Pleasanton, CA	Jeff Huxhold	Emma Overell
(Canada) Kitchener, ON	June 3	Chicopee Ski Resort, Kitchener, Ontario	Tyler Krishenske	Bethany McChesney
(United States) Seattle	June 10	Remlinger Farms, Carnation, WA	Aaron Barquist	Ricki Creger
(United States) Portland, OR	June 17	Portland International Raceway, Portland, OR	Josh Fry	Tasha Overmiller
(United States) New York City	June 24	Aviator Sports Complex, Brooklyn, NY	Ben Whitbeck	Elysia Cronheim
(United States) New Jersey	July 8 & 9	Raceway Park, Englishtown, NJ	Billy Allen / John Hirsch	Jane Seo / Christine Mandela
(United States) Kansas City, MO	September 9	Snow Creek Ski Area, Weston, MO	Jim Kirtley	Sonya Eudy
(Canada) Calgary, AB	July 29	WinSport at Canada Olympic Park, Calgary, Alberta	Kody O'Brien	Nancy Loranger
(United States) Denver, CO	August 12	Thunder Valley Motocross Park, Morrison, CO	Tyler Veerman	Leslie St. Louis
(Canada) Vancouver, BC	July 15	Cloverdale Fairgrounds, Surrey, British Columbia	Matt Petranic	Chelsea Macklen
(United States) Pennsylvania	August 5	Maple Grove Raceway, Mohnton, PA	Justin Pavlick	Dixie Bonner
(United States) Atlanta, GA	August 19	Georgia Int’l Horse Park, Conyers, GA	Yuri Force	Cassandra Aslani
(United States) Chicago/Milwaukee	August 26	Wilmot Mountain Ski Resort, WI	Matt Hoover	Margaret Cavenagh
(United States) Southern Indiana	September 2	Paoli Peaks, IN	Taylor Clark	Jill Vance
(United States) Twin Cities, MN	September 16	Wild Mountain Ski Area, Taylor Falls, MN	Mike Ferguson	Lacey Bourgois
(United States) Long Island, NY	July 22	Long Island Sports Park, NY	Billy Allen	Samantha Gesuele
(United States) New England	Sept 30 & Oct 1	Motocross 338, Southwick, MA	Bronson Venable / John Hirsch	Angela Peterson / Nicole Aleles
(United States) Austin, TX	October 28	Reveille Peak Ranch, Austin, TX	Aaron Brabson	Camille McCue
(United States) Southern California	November 11	Temecula Downs Events Ctr, CA	Glenn Racz	Faye Morgan / Michelle Starkey

== Race details ==
=== Qualifying and Placement ===
Rugged Maniac is open to all participants aged 12 or older.

There are no qualifying standards to be met in order to be considered for placement. To be considered for the winning podium, runners must race in the "Elite Heat" wave of runners with timing chips. As of January 2017, the timing chip system has been removed and replaced with a manual record of the top 10 finishers in each category.

Skipping an obstacle result in the disqualification from placing in the official results.

=== Obstacles ===
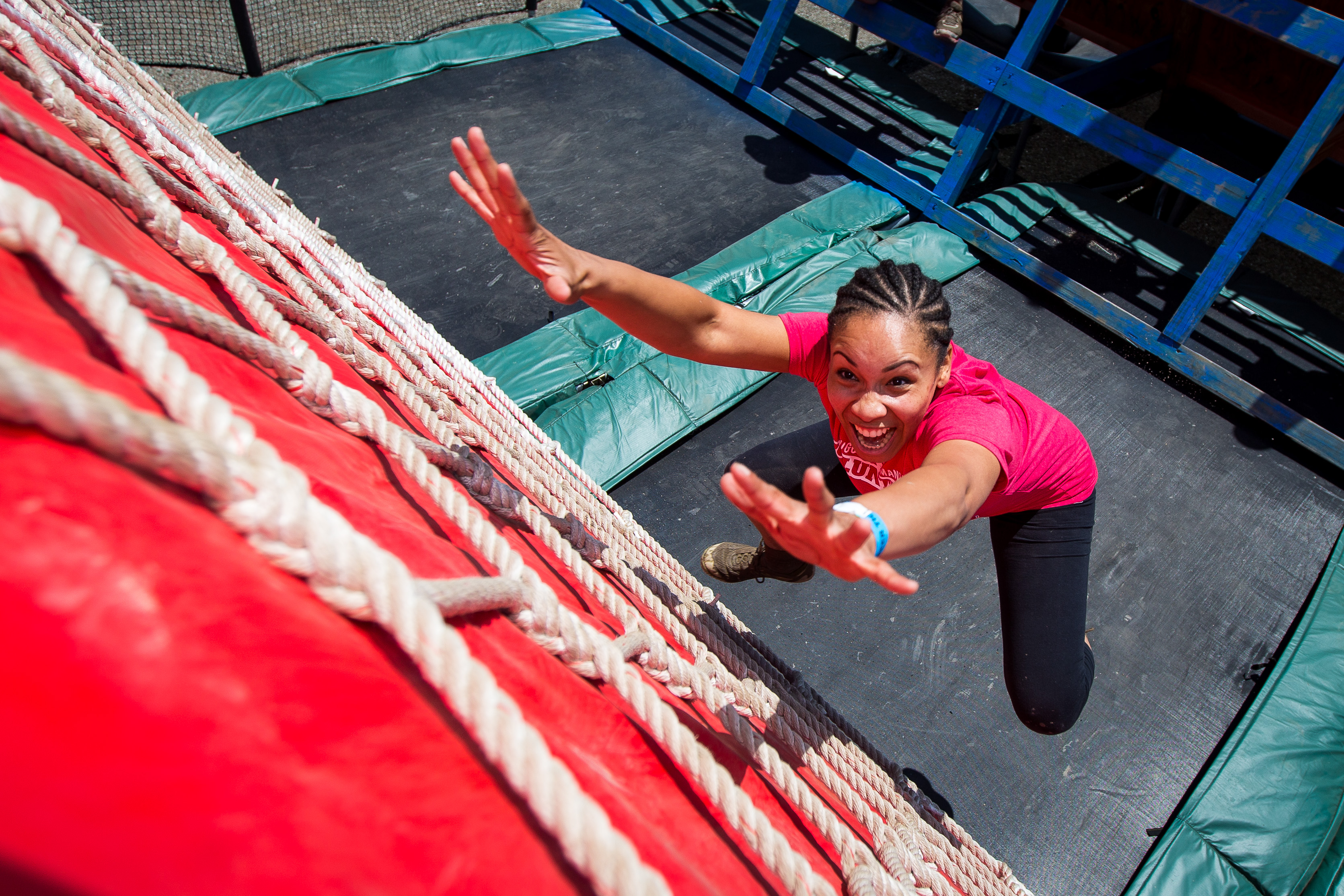
Antigravity

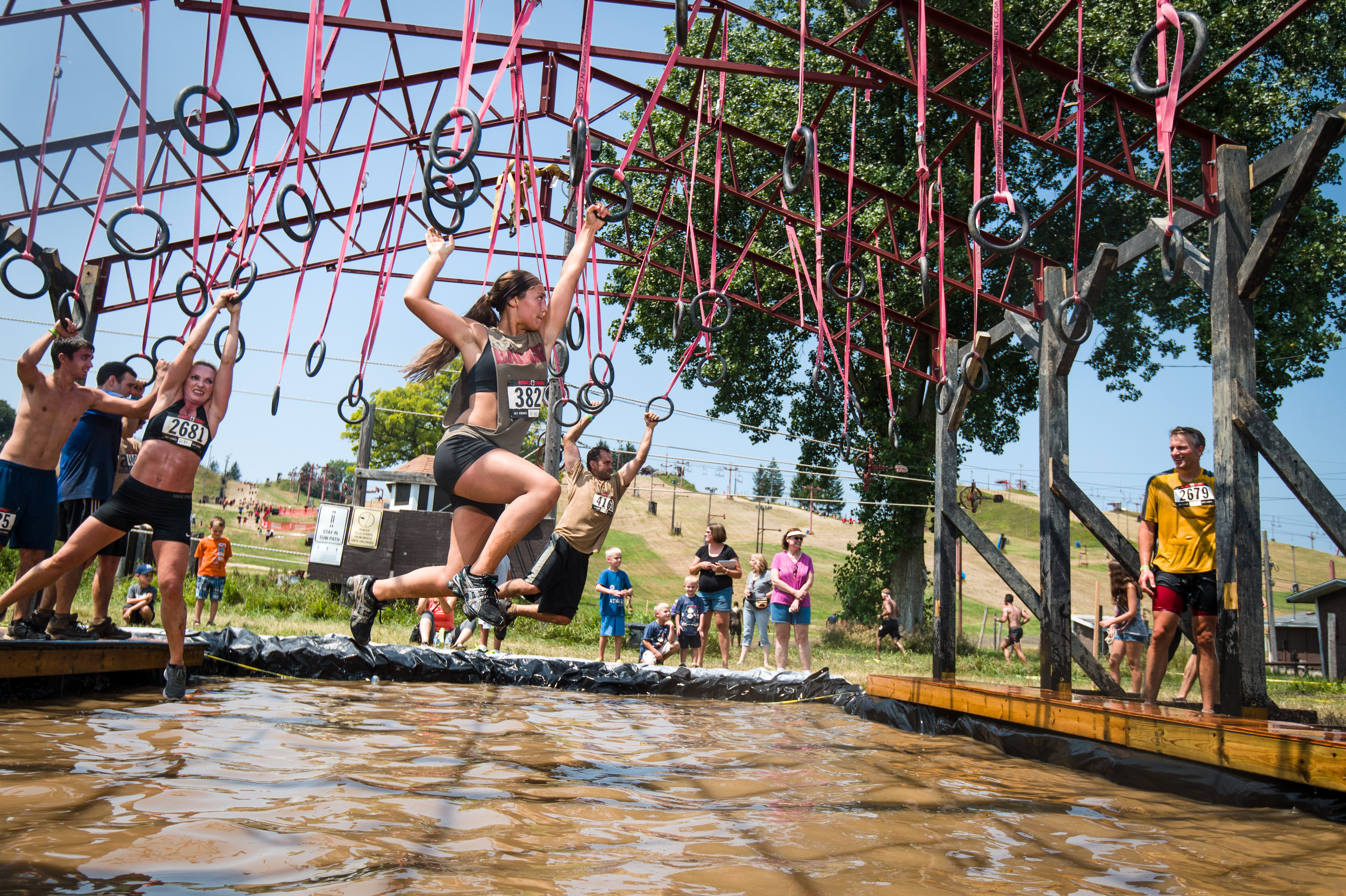
The Ringer

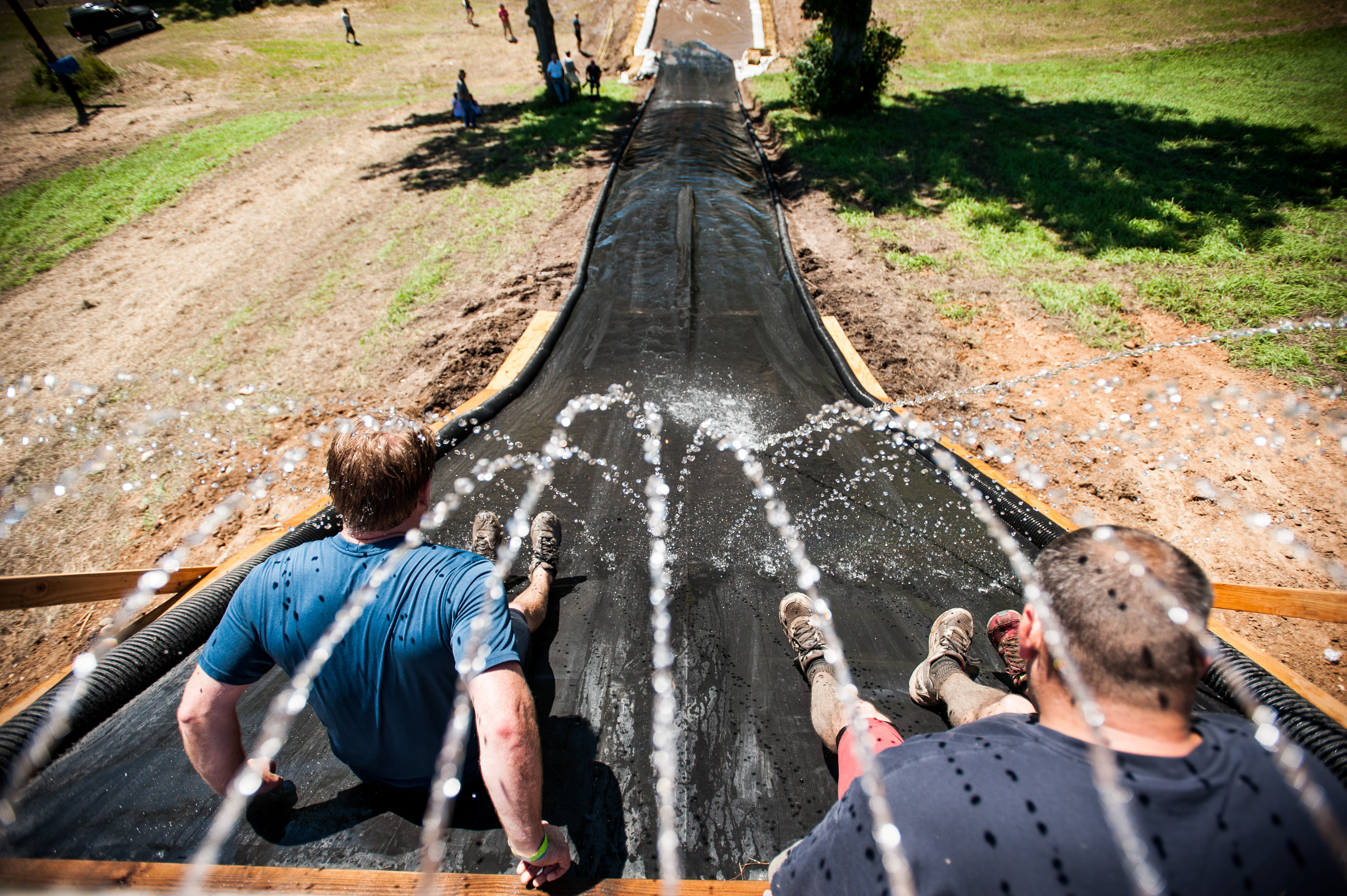
The Accelerator

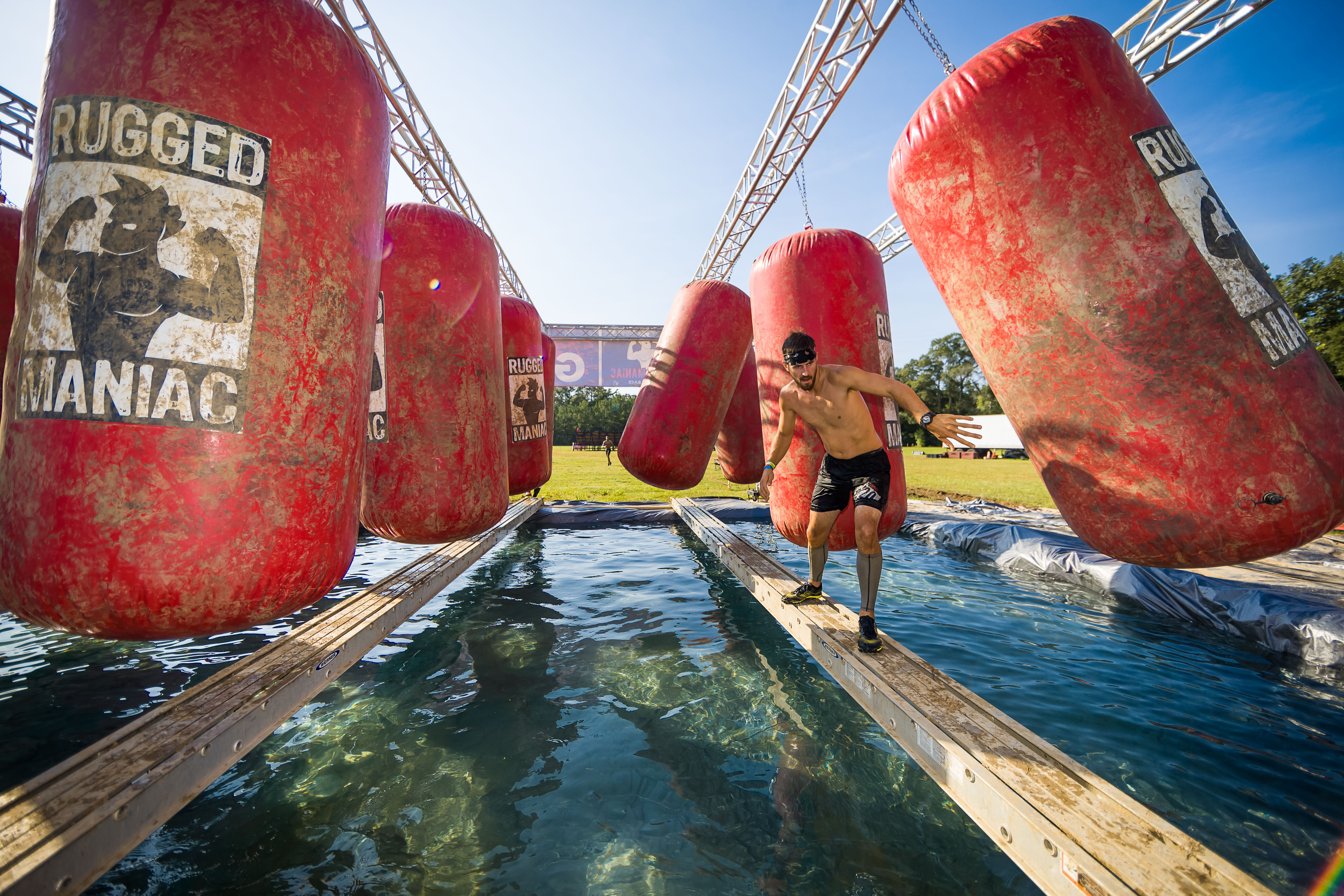
The Gauntlet

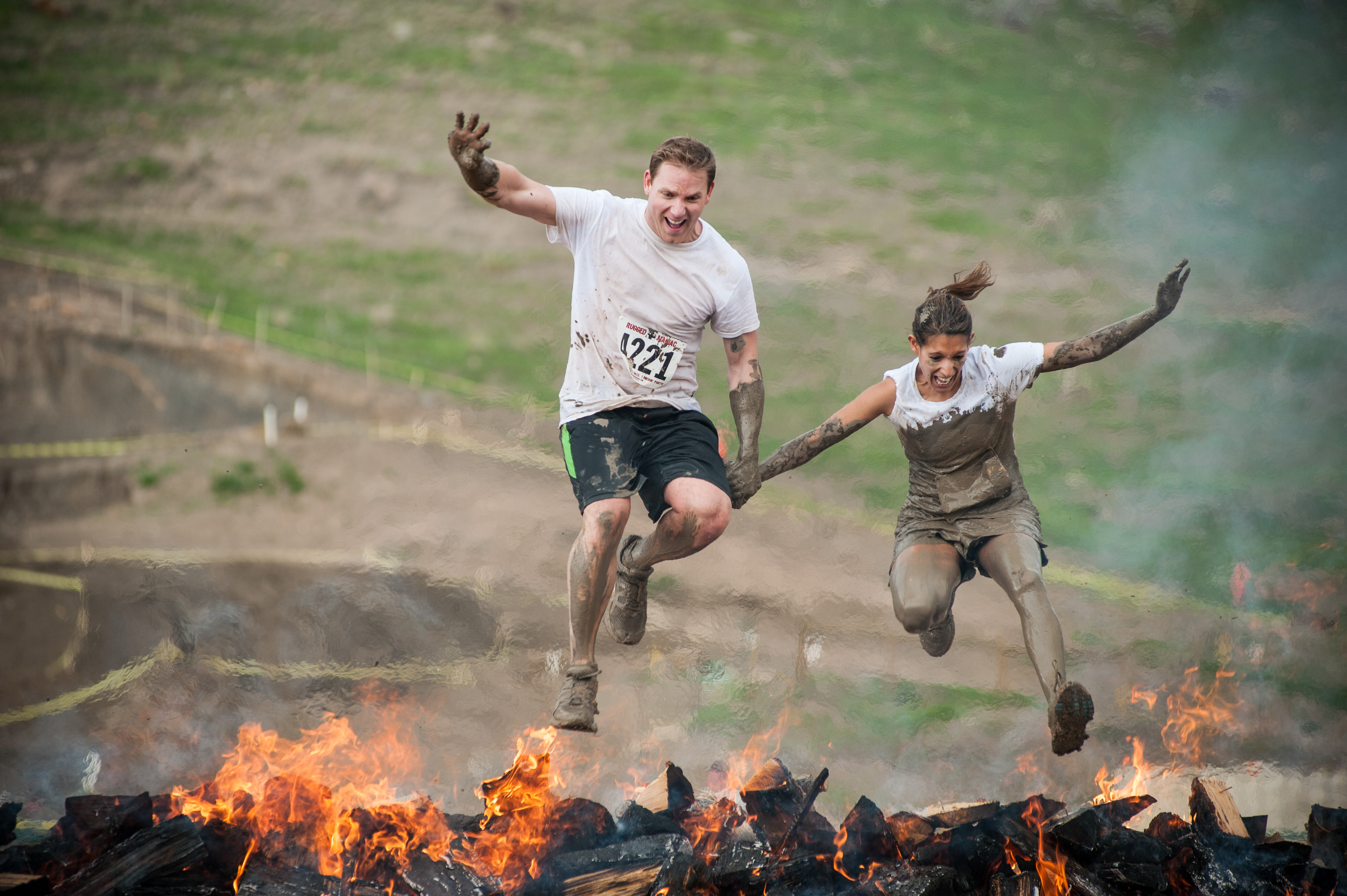
The Pyromaniac

The Trenches

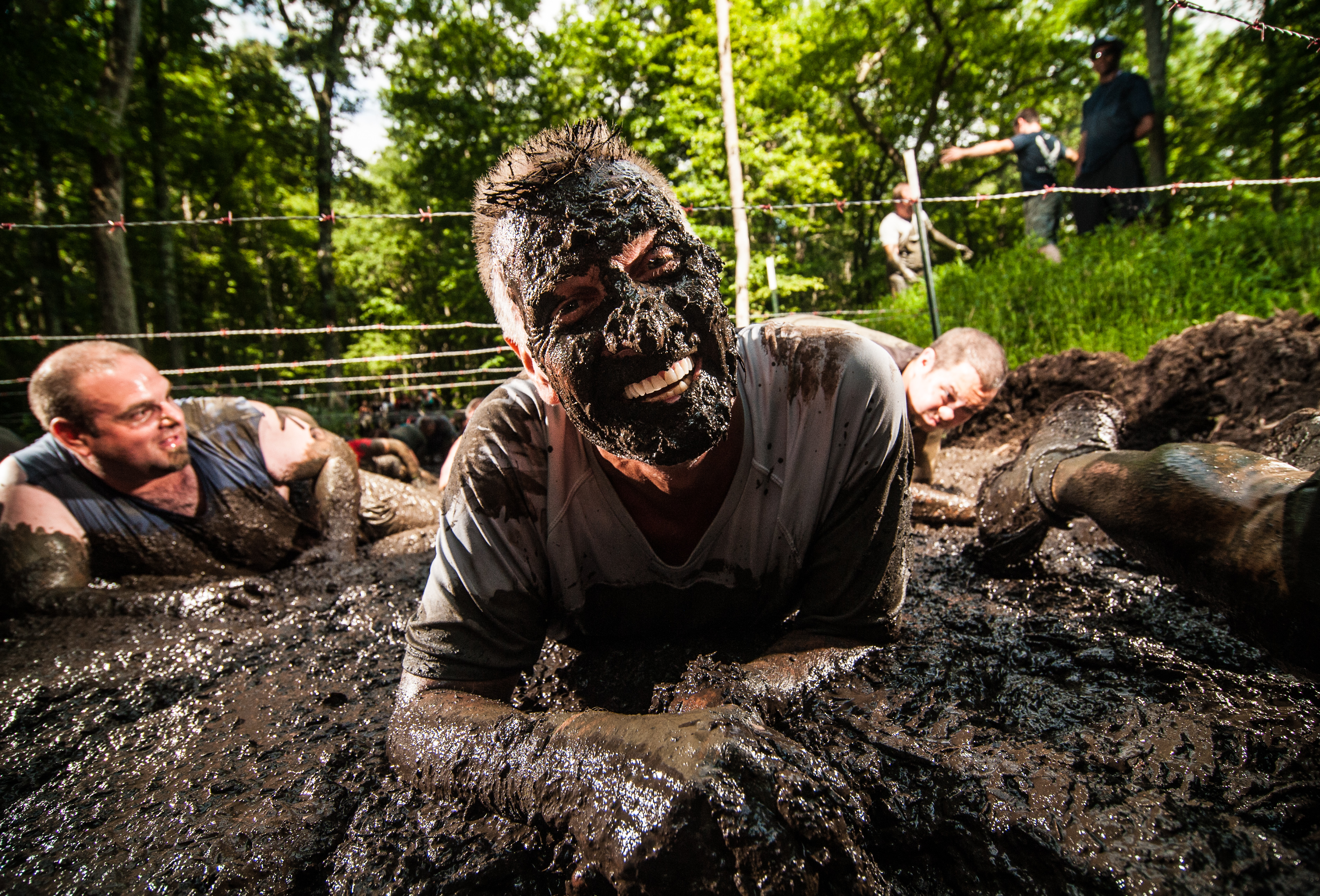
The Head Scratcher

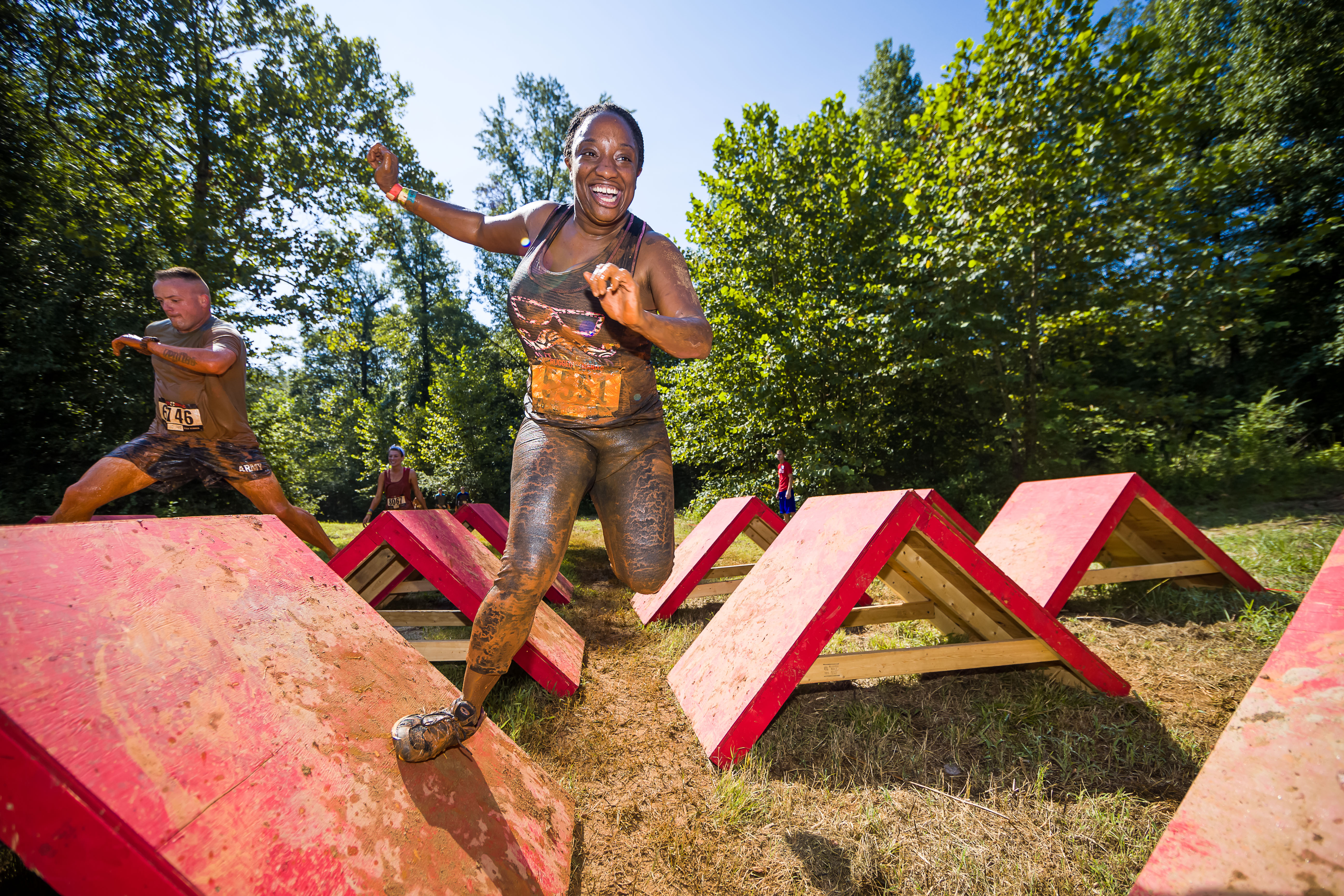
The Ninja Escape

Rugged Manic has 25 obstacles over a 5 km (3.1-mile) course. While the type of obstacles may vary from location to location, each course has 25 obstacles. This includes:

- Antigravity - Two rows of trampolines which bounce the participant up a padded cargo climbing wall.
- Frog Hop - Floating wooden/plastic platforms, "lilypads", held together by rope and spanning a muddy river.
- The Ringer - Rows of pull-up rings suspended over a large water pit.
- Accelerator - A steep, 50-foot water slide into a deep pool of water.
- The Gauntlet 2.0 - Massive swinging bags suspended over narrow paths made of foam pads. These paths slowly sink into the pool of water.
- The Warped Wall - A tall wall (2.6 meters tall) curving backwards at the top.
- Leap of Faith - A 4-foot-deep pool of muddy water in which participants jump into and cross.
- Pyromaniac - Rows of burning logs. Participants must jump over these logs.
- Waterworks - Large floating pipes in waist-deep water in which participants must go under and over them.
- Balance or Bust - Thin wooden walkways over water.
- Tipping Point - A see-saw obstacle.
- Let's Cargo - Cargo nets leading up a steep incline.
- Pipe Dream - Large drainage pipes to crawl through, usually placed through mud tunnels.
- Commando Crawl - A crawl through muddy waters under barbed wire. Usually found near "Pipe Dream".
- Claustrophobia - Dark, narrow tunnels cut through the earth.
- Speed Trap - Muddy water with randomly placed, steep drop-offs.
- Napoleon Complex - 8-foot-tall wooden scaling walls.
- The Trenches - Wide mud trenches dug in the ground; participants must leap over them.
- Quad Burners - Tall dirt hills.
- Jacob's Ladder - 12-foot-tall wooden ladder pyramids.
- Head Scratcher - A low belly-crawl under barbed wire through a muddy, watery field.
- Ninja Escape - Triangular wooden platforms placed in a zig-zag formation above a muddy field.
- Beam Me Up - A slanted 14-foot ladder wall.
- Pack Mule - Participants may select a 25- or 50-pound sandbag to carry over a short distance.
- Shoe Catcher - Thick pool of mud that runners must run through.
- Barricades - Short, 4-foot walls that are designed for participants to vault over.
- Bang the Gong - Small trampolines placed in front of metal gongs suspended over a body of water. Participants must jump and hit the gong before falling into the water.
- The Gauntlet (Discontinued) - Massive swinging bags over a narrow wooden path suspended over a body of water.

== Festival ==
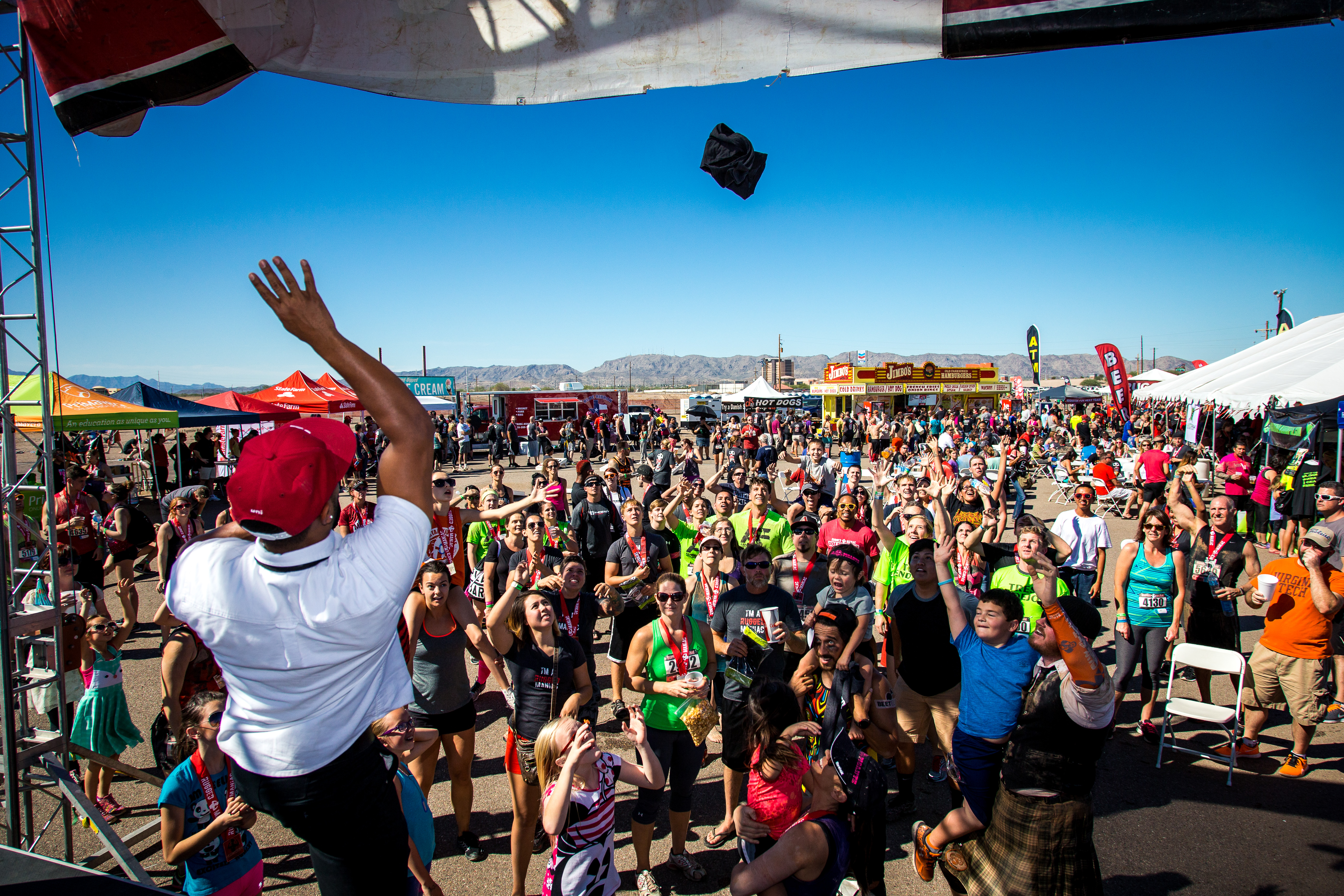
Prize Giveaway, Phoenix Rugged Maniac Festival, 2015

Rugged Maniac hosts an all-day festival during the event, which features live music, food, beer, and exhibits by their sponsor companies. Runners can participate all day and visit booths for free food and products from sponsors.

There is an awards ceremony following each race, which features a medal presentation to people in the following categories:

- Top 3 male finishers
- Top 3 female finishers
- Top male aged 20 and below
- Top female aged 20 and below
- Top male aged 50 and above
- Top female aged 50 and above

Activities such as full-sized bounce houses and mechanical bull riding are also available for all participants.

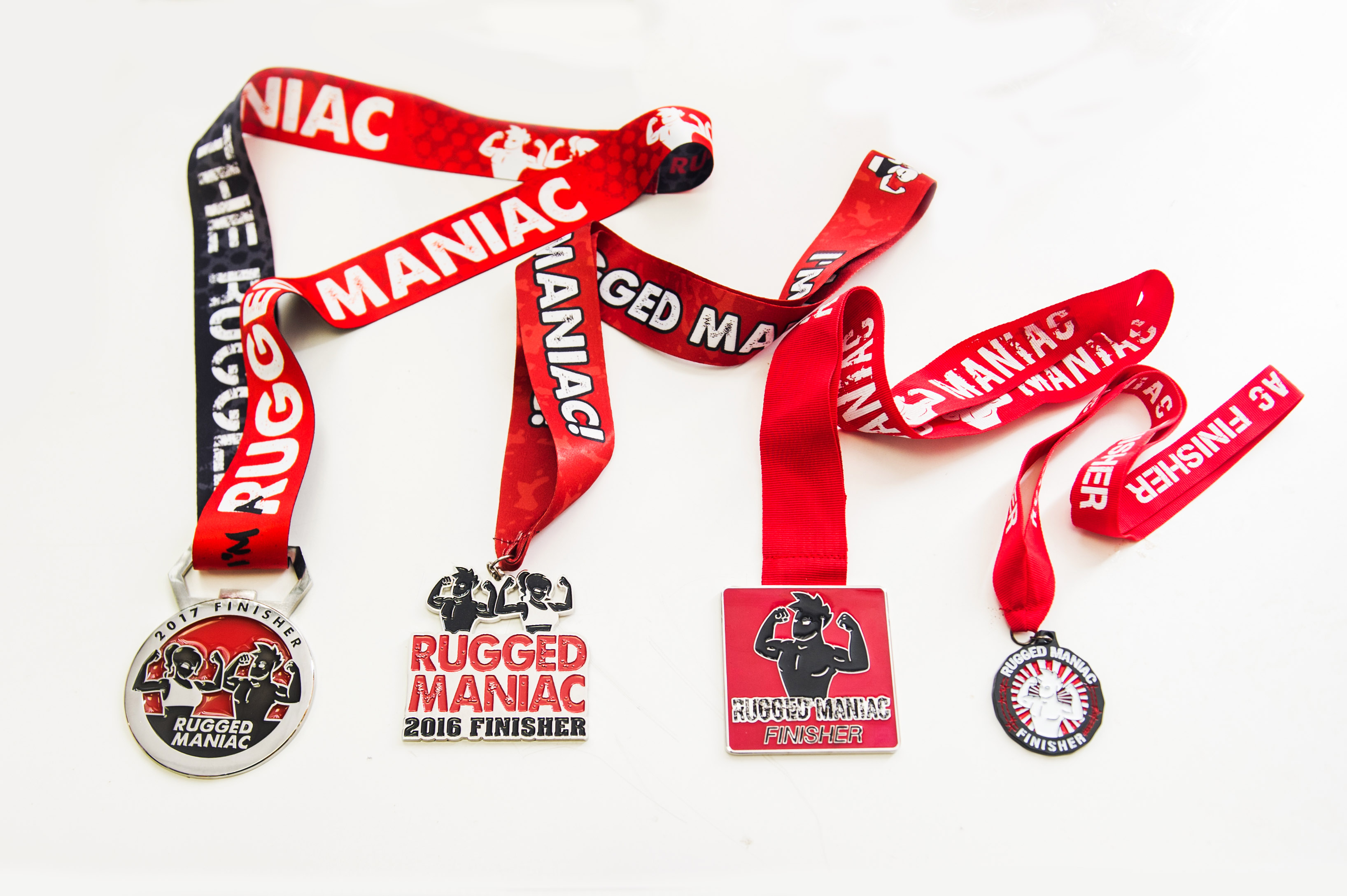
Progression of Rugged Maniac finisher medals. (from left to right: 2017 to 2014)

== Sponsors and Charity ==
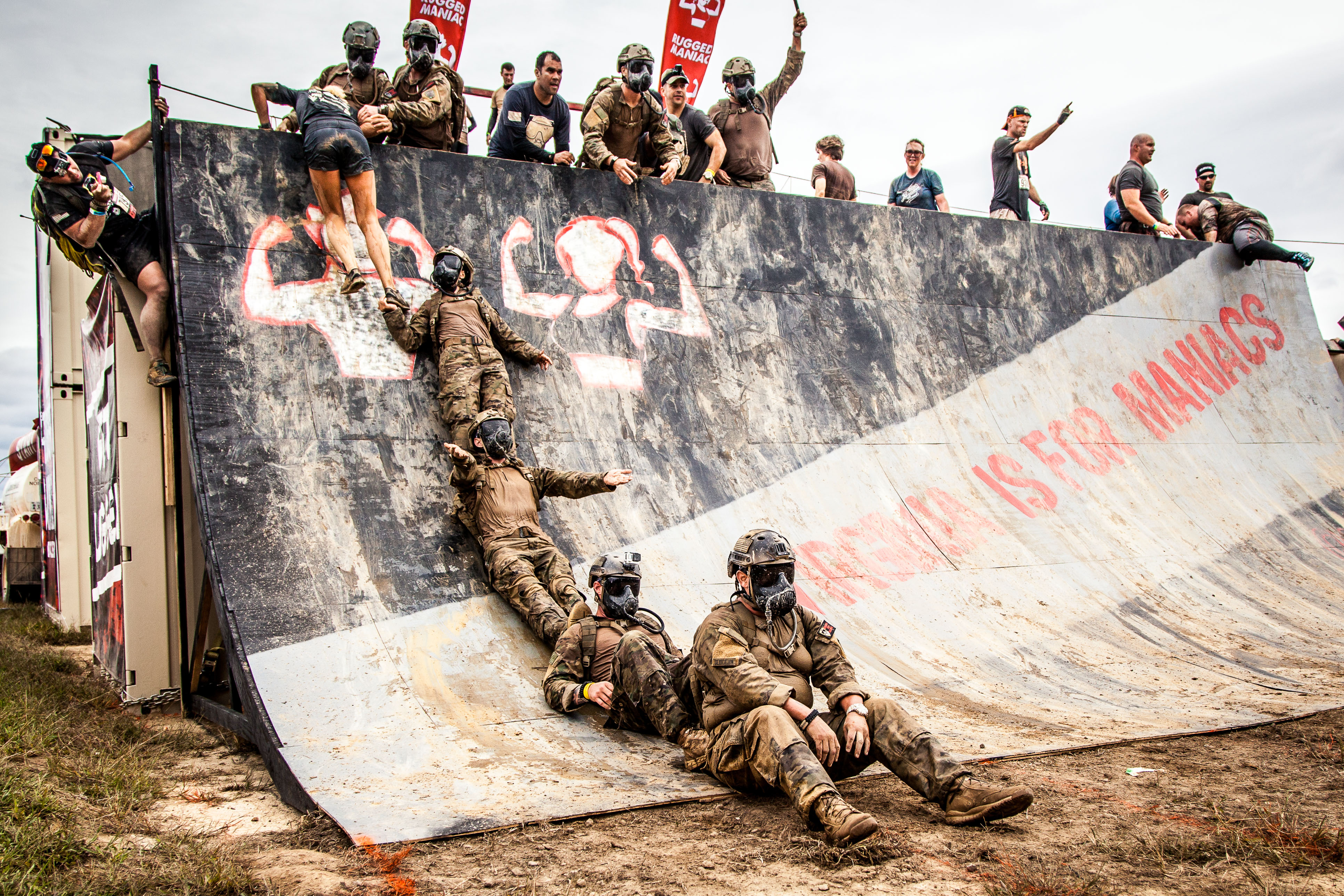
Operation Enduring Warriors, Rugged Maniac Virginia 2015

Rugged Maniac has sponsor partnerships with some notable names: Harpoon Brewery, the presenting sponsor, which will be hosting 12 races in 2016, the United Service Organizations, and the Air Force Reserve.

In 2016, Rugged Maniac announced a partnership with the American Cancer Society, which includes a fundraising platform for the ACS on Crowdrise. Rugged Maniac participants who donate the most significant amounts of money are eligible for rewards and prizes.

Operation Enduring Warriors, an organization that supports disabled veterans, participated in Rugged Maniac Virginia 2015. They are a team of veterans or active-duty military personnel who wear training masks to restrict their airflow by approximately 25%, to symbolize the hardship that wounded or disabled veterans have to endure. They participate in obstacle course races, running races from 5K's to marathons, and cycling events alongside wounded veterans, to assist them over obstacles.

== See also ==
- Obstacle racing
- Warped wall
- Obstacle course
- Tough Mudder
- Spartan Race
- American Ninja Warrior
- Warrior Dash
