= Tough Mudder =

Athletic endurance event series

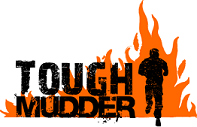
- Official Tough Mudder logo

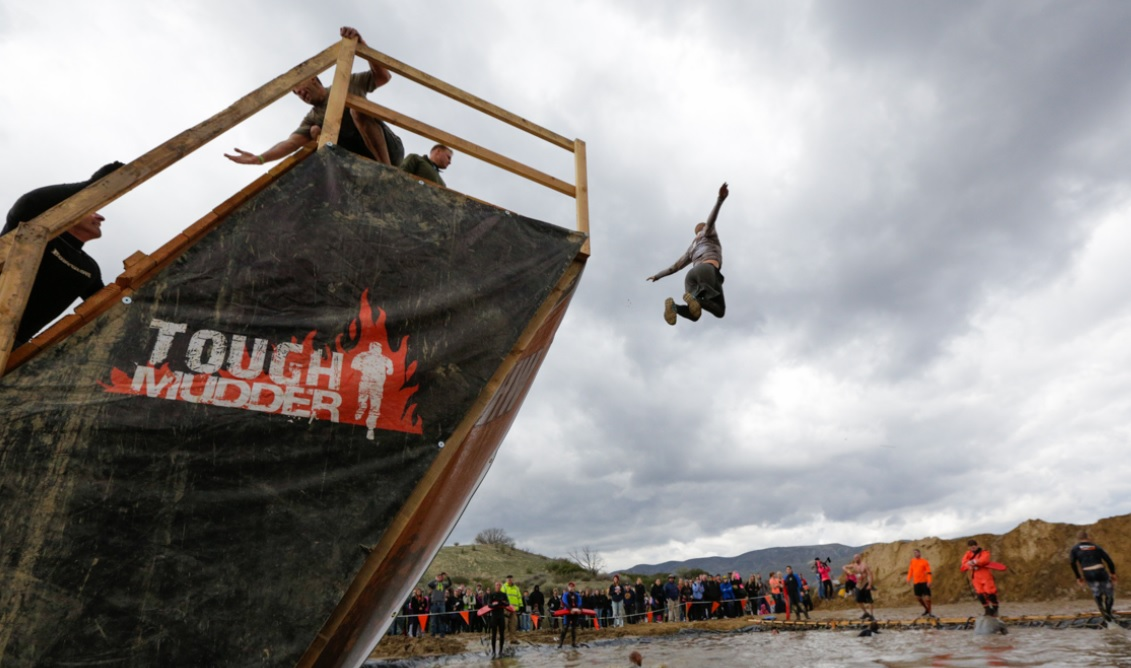
- A participant completes the Walk the Plank obstacle at the SoCal 2013 Tough Mudder event.
- Type: Mud run obstacle course race endurance events
- Headquarters: Brooklyn, NY
- Website: tmhq.com; toughmudder.com; toughmudder.co.uk; toughmudder.com.au; toughmudder.de; toughmudder.ie

Tough Mudder is an endurance event series in which participants attempt 10-to-12-mile-long (16 to 19 km) obstacle courses. It was co-founded by Will Dean and Guy Livingstone. The obstacles often play on common human fears, such as fire, water, electricity and heights.

The first Tough Mudder challenge was held in the United States in 2010, on a ski hill in Allentown, Pennsylvania. As of 2016, more than three million people worldwide have participated in Tough Mudder events.

In January 2020, the Tough Mudder was petitioned for involuntary Chapter 11 bankruptcy by creditors Valley Builders LLC, Trademarc Associates Inc. and David Watkins Homes Inc.

Spartan Race acquired Tough Mudder, which had been forced into involuntary bankruptcy proceedings, in February 2020. Spartan Race purchased Tough Mudder assets for $700,000 and the assumption of debts, including honoring prepaid tickets, which was approved by the bankruptcy court for the District of Delaware. As of January 2024, 19 Tough Mudder events were scheduled for the remainder of the year in the United States and Canada.

== History ==
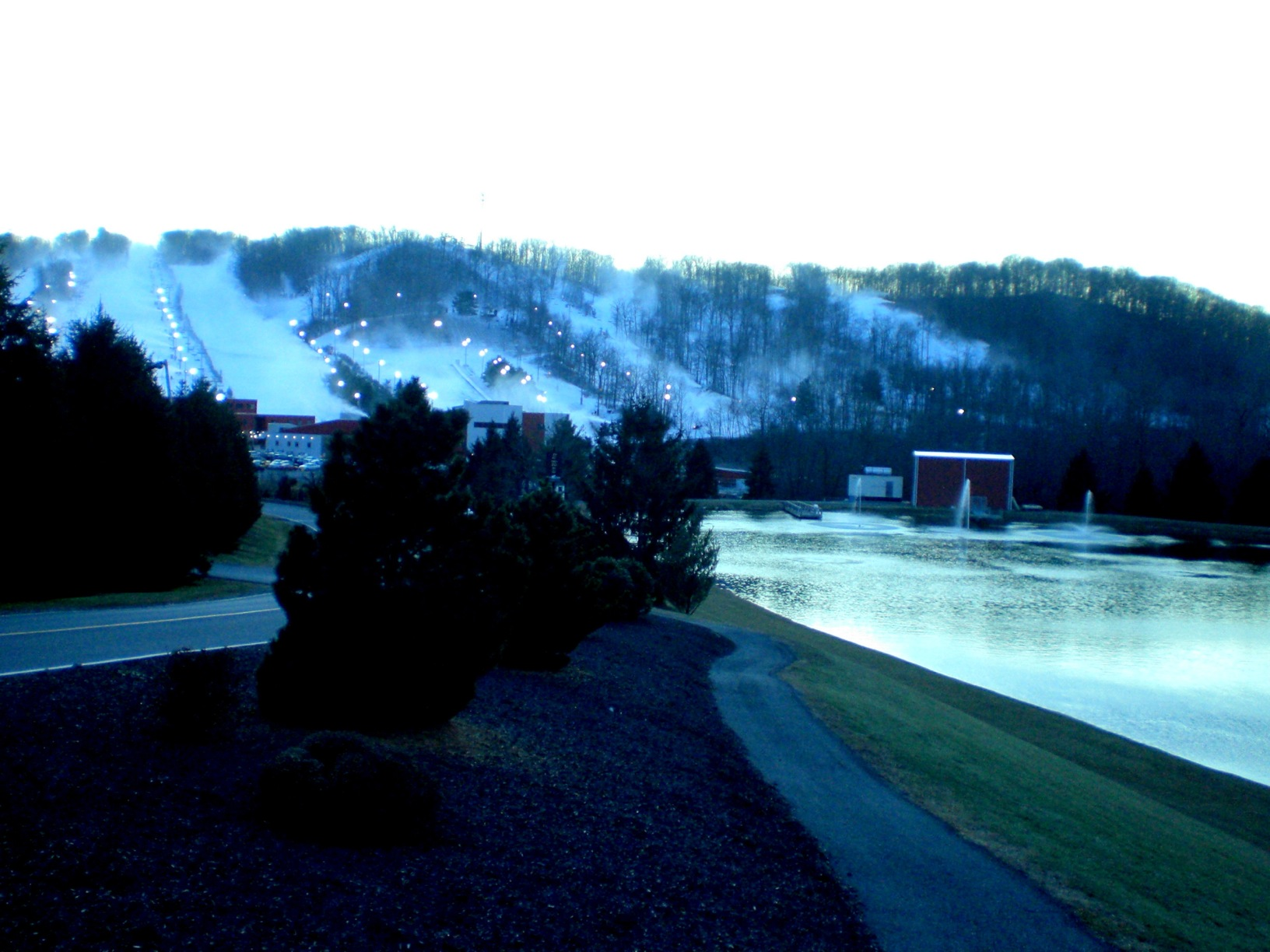
Bear Creek Mountain Resort in Macungie, Pennsylvania, where 4,500 participants gathered for the first Tough Mudder event on May 2, 2010

Tough Mudder was co-founded in 2010 by Will Dean and Guy Livingstone, both British subjects living in New York City. Dean, a former British counter-terrorism officer, had developed the idea for the company while studying at Harvard Business School, where the concept was a semifinalist in the school's annual business plan competition. Tough Mudder's original branding was developed by the Brooklyn design studio Condensed. Tough Mudder continued to credit Condensed on the toughmudder.com website even after a later redesign by a different agency. It has been noted that Will Dean took the idea from Billy Wilson and his Tough Guy races staged in England since 1987. Dean and Livingstone, a former corporate lawyer, held the first Tough Mudder event on May 2, 2010, at Bear Creek Mountain Resort near Allentown, Pennsylvania. Promoted exclusively through Facebook advertising and word of mouth, the event drew more than 4,500 participants.

On May 2, 2013, Tough Mudder announced that it had reached one million total registrations since it started in 2010. The company had more than 700,000 participants in 2013, with events in the U.S., UK, Australia, Canada, and Germany. The Mudderella, created in 2013, is a 5-7 mile long obstacle course series targeted toward women.

In 2014 the company also expanded to Ireland and New Zealand, with an 11-to-12-mile (18 to 20 km) military obstacle course in Auckland.

In 2015, Tough Mudder hosted more than 50 events in seven countries across three continents.

In April 2016, Tough Mudder announced a partnership with international sports management company IMG to bring its events to Asia and the Middle East, beginning with China and United Arab Emirates in 2016. Tough Mudder also announced a partnership with media and technology investment firm Seroja Partners to host an event in Bali, Indonesia in October 2016.

On October 1, 2016, in Jimbaran Hijau, Bali, Indonesia, Tough Mudder held its first event in Asia, drawing 1500 competitors from more than 37 countries including Indonesia, Singapore, and Australia. On December 9–10, 2016, up to 5,000 participated in Tough Mudder's first event in the Middle East that took place at the Hamdan Sports Complex. Tough Mudder CEO Will Dean revealed that the company would seek to launch a chain of fitness boutiques in the United States in 2017 to expand the brand beyond Obstacle Course Racing events.

In March 2017, Tough Mudder announced it was continuing its international expansion to New Zealand with Sports Media and Entertainment 360 (SME360) as the official licensee of Tough Mudder events in that country. The first event will held on November 4–5, 2017 at Hampton Downs Motorsport Park. Tough Mudder expanded its 2016 partnership deal with IMG to include Australia for 2017 and 2018 seasons, adding to events already slated in China, Japan, South Korea, Singapore, and United Arab Emirates.

In December 2019, Joe De Sena of Spartan Race stated he had options on Canadian and German Tough Mudder events via an interview on Obstacle Racing Media. He also indicated Spartan was trying to acquire the entire Tough Mudder brand. Tough Mudder shut down all online registration in December 2019, and owing to a dispute with its online registration partner Active. Obstacle Racing Media posted on December 31, 2019, that Tough Mudder Canada filed for bankruptcy.

== Event types ==
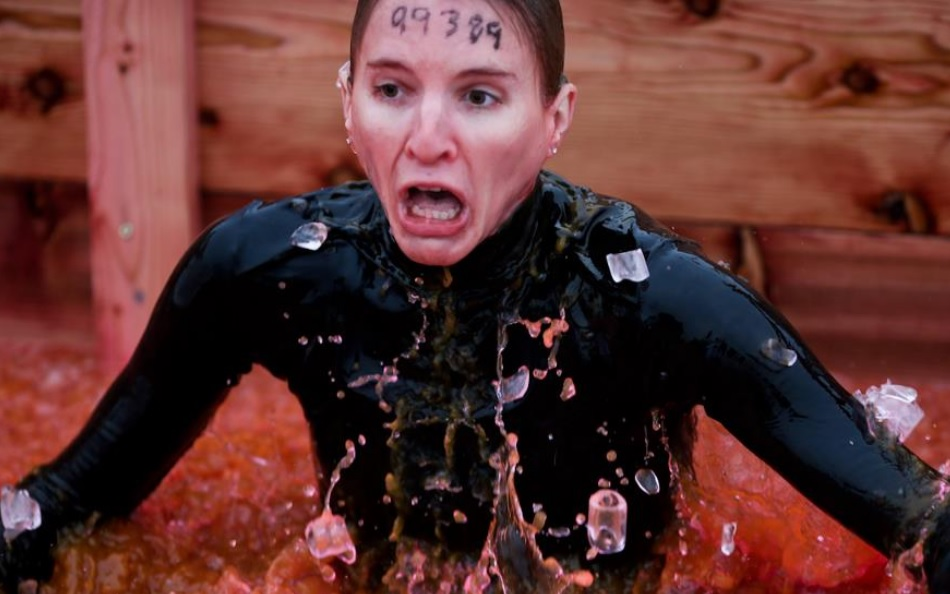
Arctic Enema

Electroshock Therapy

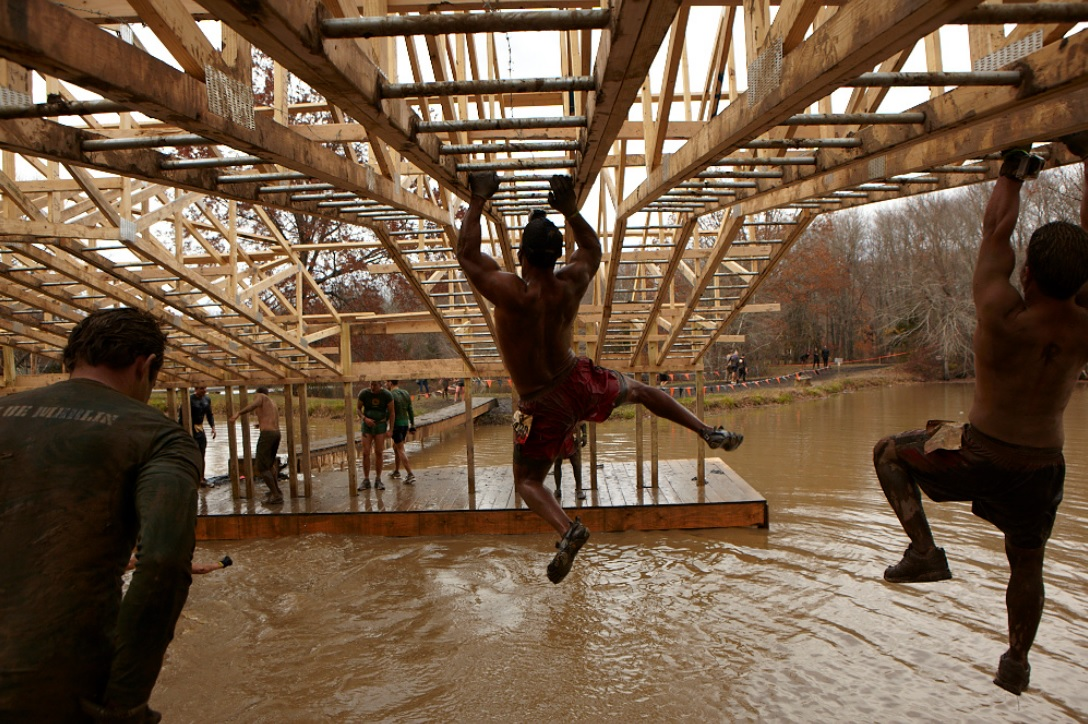
Funky Monkey

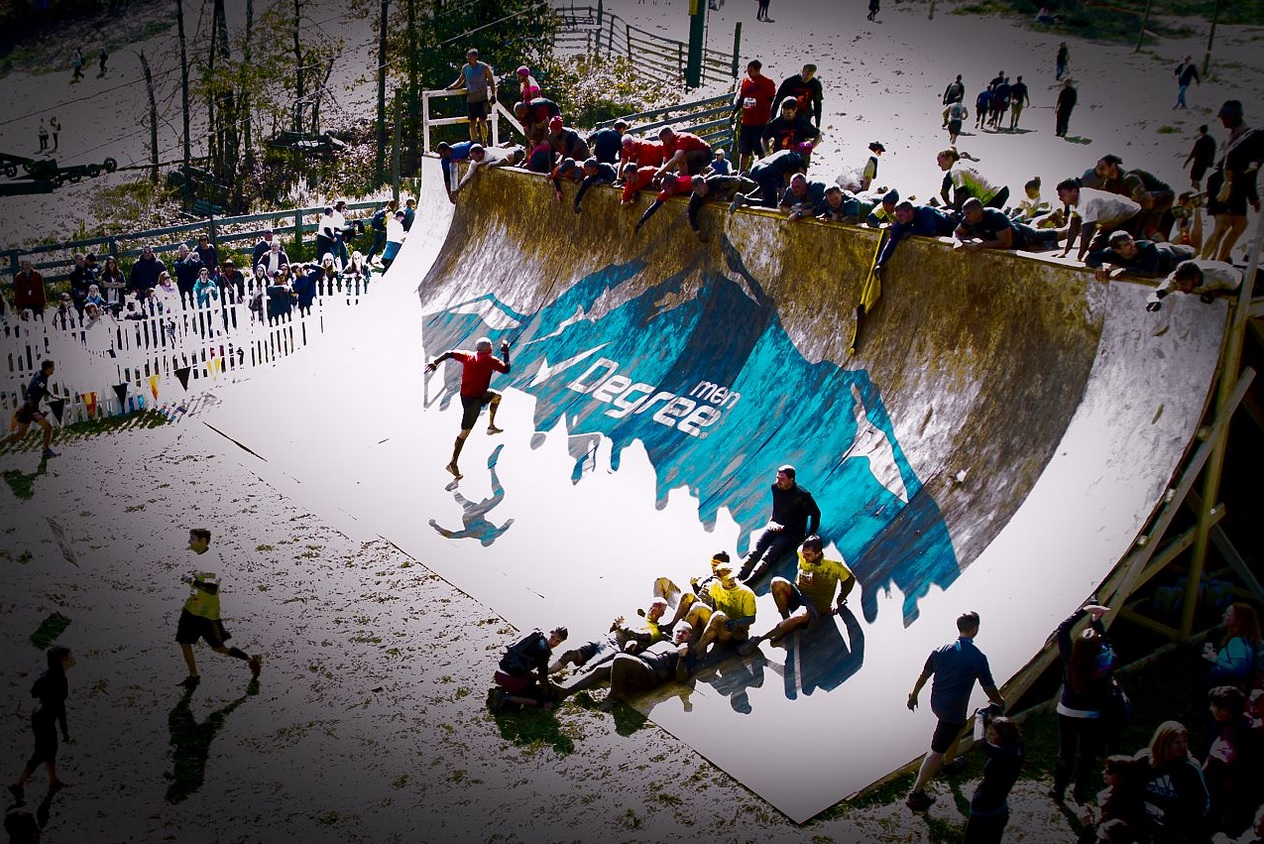
Everest

=== Tough Mudder Classic ===
The typical Tough Mudder Classic course is 8–10 miles long and features 25 obstacles. Terrain type varies from course to course; natural features of the land at each venue are incorporated into the course design. Past venues have included ranches, motocross tracks, and ski resorts.

The list of obstacles also varies from course to course, though there are several "signature" obstacles at almost every event, including:

- Arctic Enema – Participants plunge into a dumpster filled with ice water, dunk underneath a plank that crosses the dumpster, and pull themselves out on other side.
- Electroshock Therapy – Live wires hang over a field of mud which participants must traverse.
- Funky Monkey – A set of incline and decline monkey bars over a pit of cold water. The bars are slicked with a mixture of butter and mud.
- Everest – Participants run up a quarter pipe slicked with mud and grease.

=== Tough Mudder 5K ===
At 5 kilometres long, Tough Mudder Half events are just under half the distance of a typical Tough Mudder challenge. The courses feature signature Tough Mudder obstacles including Block Ness Monster, Kiss of Mud, and Everest; however, they do not include any obstacles with fire, ice, or electric shocks.

=== Tougher Mudder ===
Tougher Mudder, a timed, competitive start wave at the beginning of Tough Mudder events that will be held at select venues with prize money to the top 3 finishers. The OCR World Championships team confirmed that Tougher Mudder will be a qualifier for the OCR World Championships.

In September 2017, Tough Mudder announced that it was launching the $50,000 Tougher Mudder Championship Race Series, which was streamed live on Facebook Watch (see below under Facebook Watch). The series kicked off on Oct. 7 at Tougher Tri-State in Englishtown, New Jersey, and culminated with the Championship on Nov. 4 in Lake Elsinore, California. The race featured some of the world's top extreme athletes, functional fitness athletes and endurance runners as they tackled 20 plus obstacles on a 10-mile course. .

=== Tough Mudder 5K Urban ===
Tough Mudder 5K is 3.1 miles or 5K in length. Tough Mudder announced in October 2017, that it will be bringing the 5K to London, Manchester, and Edinburgh in the Summer of 2018 and will offer an "Up-Late" special Friday Evening 5K event as a way for people to kick off their weekends. Tough Mudder expanded its 5K event to more than 25 cities in the US and more than five countries globally including Germany, Canada, and Oman in 2018. The 5K features 10 obstacles. Tough Mudder held its first 5K in the UK on March 23, 2018, in Stratford. Soap Opera actress Jorgie Porter ran the event.

=== Toughest Mudder ===
In 2016, Tough Mudder, Inc. announced it will debut a new series, Toughest Mudder, in 2017. The series will be six events held in the US, UK and Canada. Each will be eight hours in length, that will lead into the entry into the "Contender Category" for World's Toughest Mudder 2017.

=== Tough Mudder X ===
Tough Mudder X is a mix of Tough Mudder, strength-based Cross-Fit exercises and road racing to determine "Fittest, Fastest Athletes in the World". The event has 200 selected athletes (one must apply to be considered for the event) competing in heats of 12 on a one-mile course that includes 10 Tough Mudder obstacles and 10 "Functional Fitness Workout Zones" with such exercises as pull-ups, box jumps, and wall balls. All obstacles and workout zones must be finished. The top 24 male and female finishers of preliminary heats move on to the finals. Winning purse is $50,000—the men's and women's winners each take home $25,000. This new event aired on CBS (see below under CBS Sports) in August and September in 2017. In 2018, the qualifier and open competitions took place Sunday, March 25, in Sacramento, California; and Sunday, April 8, in Miami, with the finale to be held in Richmond, Virginia, on Friday, June 8.

=== Mini Mudder ===
In 2015, Tough Mudder debuted Fruit Shoot Mini Mudder, an obstacle course challenge for children. Mini Mudder events are designed for children aged five to twelve (as of 2019), and are about a mile long, including of four laps of a loop that has 10 obstacles.

=== Urban Mudder ===
The five-mile course featured obstacles including "Rock and a Hard Place" and "Rooftop Series"; the event also featured a live DJ, festival area, and beer garden.

=== World's Toughest Mudder ===
Junyong Pak

Amelia Boone

The first and second place finishers of World's Toughest Mudder 2012

The competition consists of a 5-mile (8.0 km) looped course, which participants continuously run through for 24 hours. The participant who completes the most laps is declared the winner. The winners receive the title of "World's Toughest Mudder" and a $10,000 prize for the winning solo male and female and a $12,000 prize for the winning team.

World's Toughest Mudder was first held in 2011 at Raceway Park in New Jersey. The team competition was introduced in 2012; a team from Pennsylvania calling themselves "Nine Inch Males" took first place. There were over 1,200 competitors in 2012.

World's Toughest Mudder in 2014 was held at Lake Las Vegas in Nevada and was a 5-mile course with obstacles such as a 35-foot drop into a lake during the day and swimming 300 yards while keeping a torch lit at night. Top finishers in 2014 were Ryan Atkins (19 laps, 95 miles, male solo), Amelia Boone (15 laps, 75 miles, female solo), and Team Wolf Pack (15 laps, 75 miles, team).

In 2016, about 1500 competitors from around the world converged on Lake Las Vegas for the third year in a row to compete in the World's Toughest Mudder. New to the 6th annual running of the event was a $100K bonus prize for the first team to pass the 100-mile mark. In addition, all three men's finalists surpassed the 100-mile mark (another event milestone) with first place going to Trevor Cichosz who also completed 105 miles. Stefanie Bishop, who signed up for the event at the last minute, took the Women's lead early and never lost it, taking the Women's crown by completing 85 miles. In 2017, Ryan Atkins and Rea Kolbl captured the World's Toughest Mudder titles for Men and Women.

== World's Toughest Mudder results ==
2014 results
Men

1. Ryan Atkins – 95 miles – 23:30:46
2. Jarrod Pace – 95 miles – 25:47:15
3. Trevor Cichosz – 90 miles – 24:14:07

Women

1. Amelia Boone – 75 miles – 24:57:52
2. Allison Tai – 70 miles – 25:34:48
3. Fraya Bartuska – 65 miles – 23:55:46

2015 results
Men

1. Chad Trammell – 95 miles – 24:00:10
2. Trevor Cichosz – 95 miles – 24:17:34
3. Brad Carron-Arthur – 90 miles – 24:35:02

Women

1. Amelia Boone – 75 miles – 24:10:17
2. Sara Knight – 70 miles – 24:40:02
3. Deanna Blegg – 70 miles – 25:08:11

2016 results
Men

1. Trevor Cichosz - 105 miles - 24:00:15
2. Austin Azar - 100 miles - 22:43:51
3. Kristopher Mendoza - 100 miles - 24:45:17

Women

1. Stefanie Bishop - 85 miles - 25:05:52
2. Susanne Kraus - 80 miles - 24:02:13
3. Morgan McKay - 80 miles - 24:08:53

Team

1. Team Goat Tough - 105 miles - 24:02:48
2. Team America - 100 miles - 24:52:20
3. Team Mayhem - 90 miles - 24:26:35

2017 results
Men

1. Ryan Atkins - 110 miles - 22 Laps
2. Robert Kilian - 105 miles - 21 Laps
3. Trevor Cichosz - 95 miles - 19 Laps

Women

1. Rea Kolbl - 90 miles - 18 Laps
2. Allison Tai - 85 miles - 17 Laps
3. Michelle Ford - 80 miles - 16 Laps

Team

1. 3 Guys and a Spartan - 120 miles - 24 Laps
2. North America GOAT Tough - 120 miles - 24 Laps
3. Germany - 110 miles - 22 Laps

2024 results
Men

1. Michael Schjott - 115 miles - 23 Laps
2. Joshua Fiore - 110 miles - 22 Laps
3. Christian Brown-Johnson - 105 miles - 21 Laps

Women

1. Nikki Caromba - 95 miles - 19 Laps
2. Jenny Stipp - 90 miles - 18 Laps
3. Sarah Tucker - 85 miles - 17 Laps

Team

1. Mountain Men - 125 miles - 25 Laps
2. Ultracave - 105 miles - 21 Laps
3. Iowa Hot Guys - 100 miles - 20 Laps

=== All-Time World's Toughest Mudder Winners ===
==== Men ====
- 2024: Michael Schjott (115 miles)
- 2023: Austin Azar (105 miles)
- 2022: DJ Fox (105 miles)
- 2021: Mark Batres (115 miles)
- 2019: Trevor Cichosz (105 miles)
- 2018: Kristopher Mendoza (100 miles)
- 2017: Ryan Atkins (110 miles)
- 2016: Trevor Cichosz (105 miles)
- 2015: Chad Trammell (95 miles)
- 2014: Ryan Atkins (95 miles)
- 2013: Ryan Atkins (100 miles)
- 2012: Junyong Pak (95 miles)
- 2011: Junyong Pak (56 miles)

==== Women ====
- 2023: Nikki Caromba (95 miles)
- 2023: Kris Rugloski (90 miles)
- 2022: Kris Rugloski (100 miles)
- 2021: Katie Knight (90 miles)
- 2019: Morgan McKay (80 miles)
- 2018: Rea Kolbl (75 miles)
- 2017: Rea Kolbl (90 miles)
- 2016: Stefanie Bishop (85 miles)
- 2015: Amelia Boone (75 miles)
- 2014: Amelia Boone (75 miles)
- 2013: Deanna Blegg (85 miles)
- 2012: Amelia Boone (90 miles)
- 2011: Juliana Sproles (48 miles)

==== Teams ====
- 2023: D-Fit Black (90 miles)
- 2022: USOCR Midwest (95 miles)
- 2021: Two Lokos (125 miles)
- 2019: Muddy Canucks (105 miles)
- 2019: German Toughest Mudders (85 miles)
- 2018: Lindsay's Angels (80 miles)
- 2018: Team Atomik (75 miles)
- 2017: Fitone Gettingtough (85 miles)
- 2017: Team United States (120 miles
- 2016: Team Goat Tough (105 miles)
- 2015: Synergy Sports (80 miles)
- 2014: Wolfpack Spartan (75 miles)
- 2013: 3AM Waterfalls (80 miles)
- 2012: Nine Inch Males (60 miles)

== Tough Mudder Bootcamp ==
In May 2017, Tough Mudder launched a studio fitness brand extension, Tough Mudder Bootcamp. The first two franchises, in Las Vegas and Burlington, Massachusetts, opened in April 2018. Franchises cost $50,000 with total startup cost ranging from $200K to $300K. Ten franchises have been sold and more than 65 have been reserved across the USA. The Bootcamps provide 45-minute HIIT classes for up to 24 participants each and are designed to be done with a partner. Classes are instructor-led with assistance from a proprietary technology platform that guides participants through each class station.

== Mudder Legion ==
A person who successfully finishes a Tough Mudder event is deemed a "Legionnaire," Tough Mudder collectively calls all its finishers the "Mudder Legion". Each finisher receives a headband for completing a Tough Mudder. Tough Mudder created a handcrafted steel headband for the first legionnaire, Jim Campbell, who completed 100 Tough Mudders.

== Innovation ==
In 2012, Tough Mudder founded an off-site "Obstacle Innovation Lab" in New Jersey, where the company designs and tests new obstacles.

In January 2015, Tough Mudder announced "Tough Mudder Redefined," an initiative to revamp its courses by adding many new obstacles and updating the remaining ones.

In January 2016, Tough Mudder unveiled several new obstacles for 2016, including Block Ness Monster, a series of rotating blocks floating in waist-deep water, designed to require teamwork to conquer. This obstacle received the highest participant rating of any obstacle in Tough Mudder history while in testing. Tough Mudder also revealed three new obstacles for 2016 that are exclusive to participants who have completed more than one Tough Mudder event: Backstabber, an inclined wall ascent using pegs; Rain Main, a watery passage underneath a chain-link fence while water drips down; and Frequent Flyers' Club, a jump from a height onto a crash mat.

Tough Mudder introduced six new obstacles for 2017 season in November 2016. Obstacles include: Augustus Gloop, ascend up a vertical tube with water gushing down; Funky Monkey: The Revolution – an update on the original obstacle with series of revolving wheels to be traversed dangling over water; Arctic Enema: The Rebirth – another update on a classic – slide head first down a tube into icy water and submerge again under a wall to escape; Black Hole – an update on the original Birth Canal obstacle – one must crawl their way through a gauntlet of 100 lb. water-filled barriers in total darkness; The Reach Around – 20 foot wall that one must then go beyond vertical to scale over; and Kong – 30 foot high obstacle that participants swing from ring to ring at increasing further distant like Tarzan.

In January 2018, Tough Mudder introduced its new obstacles for the year which include Kong Infinity and Happy Ending.

== Safety ==
At the April 20, 2013 Tough Mudder Mid-Atlantic event in Gerrardstown, West Virginia, 28-year-old participant Avishek Sengupta died following an incident on the "Walk the Plank" obstacle. Witnesses told the Berkeley County sheriff's office, which investigated the death, that he was submerged in water for between five and 15 minutes. A coroner ruled the death an accidental drowning and the sheriff's office concluded it did not warrant criminal charges. This was the first fatality in Tough Mudder's history.

In 2014, The Atlantic reported on an incident at an October 2012 Tough Mudder event in Beatty, Nevada. There, three military personnel were admitted to the Nellis Air Force Base medical center with vomiting and bloody diarrhea. All had fallen face-first in mud on the Tough Mudder course on a nearby cattle ranch a week before. Subsequent investigations linked 22 cases "most likely caused by infection with the fecally transmitted bacterium Campylobacter coli," possibly from water contaminated by livestock.

Statements released by Tough Mudder since the incident have discussed the company's commitment to safety, and Tough Mudder CEO Will Dean has stated that Tough Mudder events are about 20 times safer than triathlons.

According to study by Canadian researchers and published in the Emergency Medicine Journal in 2016, serious injuries are rare at obstacle course races like Tough Mudder. Only about 1 percent of participants are injured during obstacle course races, and most of the injuries are minor and only require first aid. Lead author of the study, Dr. Alana Hawley, of McMaster University in Hamilton, said "The health risks of participating in such obstacle courses are minimal, however, and are comparable to the injury risks at any mass gathering event." Most of those injured - 89 percent - in the study group of more than 45,000 people participating in eight mud runs returned to the event without needing any further medical care.

== Charity affiliations ==
=== Team Rubicon ===
In June 2016, Tough Mudder named its new charity partner Team Rubicon, the veteran first responder organization, TEAMRUBICONUSA.org.

Tough Mudder also is partnered with Help for Heroes (in the United Kingdom), and Soldier On (in Australia).

In the United States, none of the revenue generated from Tough Mudder admissions sales goes directly to any charity. However, participants are incentivized by the Tough Mudder organization to raise money through their participation in a Tough Mudder event for donation to the Wounded Warrior Project. As of February 2014, Tough Mudder reports that their yearly revenue is approximately $75 million, and that participants have raised around $6.5 million total for the US Wounded Warrior Project since Tough Mudder's inception in 2010.

== Television ==
=== CBS Sports ===
In 2016, CBS Sports and Tough Mudder, Inc. announced a programming deal that will span across broadcast, cable and OTT/Streaming/OnDemand platforms that will offer an inside look at World's Toughest Mudder as competitors vie for a $100K prize.

In December 2016, CBS Sports aired two shows - Road to the World's Toughest Mudder, on December 15 on CBS Sports Network, which provided a comprehensive look at Tough Mudder leading up to the 2016 World's Toughest Mudder event in Las Vegas. CBS televised World's Toughest Mudder on December 25, followed by a post-event roundtable show on CBS Sports Network that featured the top competitors from the 2016 event.

In 2017, CBS Sports Network will air coverage from each of the six-event "Toughest Mudder Series", going behind-the-scenes as teams train and compete in the new event. CBS Sports again will air on CBS the "2017 World's Toughest Mudder". CBS Sports Digital will feature live streaming coverage of Toughest Mudder events on CBSSports.com and the CBS Sports apps for mobile and connected TV devices, along with on-demand video content available across CBS Sports digital and social platforms.

In June 2017, CBS Sports and Tough Mudder expanded their partnership with a new programming deal for the new Tough Mudder X event. As part of the expansion, CBS Sports has moved all Tough Mudder programming to debut on the CBS with repeats to air on CBS Sports Network in primetime and on CBS' digital platforms.

=== The CW ===
In 2016, The CW and Tough Mudder, Inc. announced a six-part series, multi-platform programming deal to run on CW Seed (the CW's digital network/streaming platform) and The CW network in 2017. The docu-series focused on "everyday heroes" attempting to run and complete a Tough Mudder including their personal stories and training for the grueling obstacle course that tests teamwork skills, physical abilities and "mental grit. Episodes one through five entitled "The Challenge Within" debuted on CW Seed on Feb. 2, 2017. The hour-long finale featured the team tackling the course and was broadcast on The CW Network on Feb. 14, 2017. The five part series entitled "The Challenge Within" debuted on CW Seed on Feb. 2, 2017 with the hour-long finale airing The CW Network on Feb. 14, 2017. In 2018, the CW ran a second, six part series entitled "Tough Mudder: Tougher Together." The first five episodes debuted on CW Seed on March 8, with the one-hour finale airing on the CW Network on March 15. Flatbush Pictures and Judd Ehrlich, the documentary team behind We Could Be King, the 2014 Emmy Award-winner for Outstanding Sports Documentary and recipient of a Grand Clio, served as executive producers of the series, along with Jesse Bull and Jennifer Nelson of Tough Mudder and independent documentary producer Carlin Cwik.

=== Sky Sports ===
Sky Sports and Tough Mudder announced in early January 2017 that on 24 January 2017 Sky Sports Mix would run Road to World's Toughest Mudder followed by coverage of the 2016 World's Toughest Mudder on 26 January 2017. In addition, Sky Sports Mix will also carry The Challenge Within later in the year. The partnership is Tough Mudder's first broadcast/video content partnership in the UK and includes content on across Sky Sports' apps for mobile devices and connected devices, as well as on skysports.com and across Sky's social media channels in January 2017.

=== ESPN ===
ESPN media distribution was named Tough Mudder's international media distribution partner in March 2017 for all of Tough Mudder's global digital and linear broadcast rights (except for the UK and the US) to the brand's competitive event series and original video offerings. Programming includes World's Toughest Mudder, Toughest Mudder, The Challenge Within and Mission Mudder (see CBS Sports, CW, Sky Sports above).

== See also ==
- American Ninja Warrior (TV series)
- Battlefrog College Championship
- Rugged Maniac
- Spartan Race
- Tough Guy Competition
- Warrior Dash
