= Warrior Dash =

- Logo
- Genre: Adventure Race
- Frequency: Recurring
- Location: International
- Years active: 6
- Inaugurated: July 18, 2009
- Website: warriordash.com

Warrior Dash was a 5 km mud run put on by Red Frog Events, an event company based in Chicago, Illinois. As of July 31, 2019, Red Frog events is no longer a company and has cancelled all Warrior Dash races and ceased operations.

== History ==
=== 2009 ===
The inaugural Warrior Dash took place on July 18, 2009, in Joliet, Illinois, at CPX Sports with 2,000 participants.

=== 2011 ===
The 2011 Warrior Dash season hosted 33 races throughout the U.S. and internationally in Canada and Australia. Total participants for the 2011 season neared 700,000.

=== 2012 ===
Red Frog Events hosted 49 Warriors Dash events in their 2012 season, their largest season yet.

=== 2013 ===
Warrior Dash 2013	Location	Date
Central Florida	Triple Canopy Ranch - Lake Wales, FL	February 2
Hawaii	Dillingham Ranch - Wailaua, HI	February 23
Central Texas	Rocky Hill Ranch - Smithville, TX	March 16
SoCal	Storm Stadium - Lake Elsinore, CA	April 6
Arizona	Camelback Ranch-Glendale-Phoenix, AZ	April 13
Georgia	Foxhall Resort and Sporting Club - Douglasville, GA	April 13
Mississippi	Mississippi Off Road Adventures - Jackson, MS	April 20
New Mexico	Balloon Fiesta Park - Albuquerque, NM	April 27
Kansas City	Platte Ridge Park - Platte City, MO	April 27 & 28
Arkansas	Timber Lodge Ranch - Amity, AR	May 11
Maryland	Budd's Creek Motocross Racetrack - Mechanicsville, MD	May 18 & 19
Oklahoma	Moore's Flying M Ranch - Inola, OK	May 18
Carolinas	Historic Rural Hill - Huntersville, NC	June 1
Ohio	Clear Fork Resort - Butler, OH	June 1
Nebraska	Pheasant Bonanza - Tekamah, NE	June 8 & 9
Illinois	Dollinger Family Farm - Channahon, IL	June 15 & 16
Minnesota	Afton Alps - Hastings, MN	June 29
Massachusetts	Carter and Stevens Farm - Barre, MA	June 29
Washington	Kelley Farm - Bonney Lake, WA	July 20
Ontario	1101 Horseshoe Valley Road - Barrie, ON	July 20
New York	Windham Mountain - Windham, NY	July 27
Michigan	E.A. Cummings Center - Mt. Morris, MI	July 27 & 28
New Jersey	Lewis Morris Park - Morris, NJ	August 3
Wisconsin	Milford Hills Hunt Club - Johnson Creek, WI	August 3
Kentucky	Life Adventure Center - Versailles, KY	August 10
Ohio II	Clay's Park Resort - N. Lawrence, OH	August 10 & 11
Colorado	Copper Mountain Ski Resort - Copper Mountain, CO	August 17
Indiana	Tom's Marine - Crawfordsville, IN	August 17
Wisconsin	Milford Hills Hunt Club - Johnson Creek, WI	August 18
Iowa	137th Street - Earlham, IA	August 24
Pennsylvania	Pocono International Raceway - Long Pond, PA	August 24
Minnesota II	Woodloch Stables - Hugo, MN	September 7
Oregon	Horning's Hideout - North Plains, OR	September 7
Michigan II	Walker, MI	September 21
Connecticut	Thompson, CT	September 21
Missouri	Wright City, MI	September 28
Virginia	Colonial Downs - New Kent, VA	September 28
Tennessee	Milky Way Farm - Pulaski, TN	October 5
Louisiana	West Feliciana Parish Sports Park - St. Francisville, LA	October 12
NorCal	Yolo Land & Cattle Co. - Esparto, CA	October 26
Alabama	Munny Sokol Park - Northport, AL	November 2

== 2016 Warrior Dash Obstacle Collapse ==
On October 9, 2016, a climbing obstacle known as the "Diesel Dome" collapsed during a Warrior Dash event at the West Feliciana Parish Sports Park, located approximately 30 miles from Baton Rouge, Louisiana. The incident occurred after 1:00 PM when more than 20 participants were simultaneously on the 30-by-50-foot arched wooden framework. Twelve people were transported to hospitals by ambulance or helicopter, including a 10-year-old child. Injuries included broken bones, lacerations, and back and neck trauma. Nurse Brandi Taylor, who suffered a broken arm in the collapse, reported that the structure appeared "structurally unsound" and fell in "slow motion."

=== Investigation and Legal Consequences ===
In August 2017, following an investigation by the Louisiana State Fire Marshal's Office, arrest warrants were issued for five individuals. Two North Carolina contractors were charged with 13 misdemeanor counts of negligent injury and one felony count each for contracting without Louisiana licensure. Three Red Frog Events employees were charged with negligent injury.

=== Safety and Construction Violation ===
The investigation revealed multiple safety and construction failures. Safety monitors, many approximately 13 or 14 years old, were provided radios but no instruction regarding participant capacity limits. Construction deficiencies included the use of 2x4-inch boards where plans specified 2x6-inch boards, and inadequate nailing. According to Chief Deputy State Fire Marshal Brant Thompson, when boards became detached from the main frame during the event, organizers attempted minor repairs rather than closing the obstacle.

The event organizers failed to follow written company safety procedures, including:

- Proper construction verification
- Monitoring of obstacles during the race
- Positioning of staff members at each obstacle for safety supervision

The event was the fourth Warrior Dash held at this location, with 6,500 pre-registered participants. Despite thousands of competitors safely traversing the obstacle before its collapse, investigators questioned the stability of other obstacles at the site. These events were widely reported in the news at the time...

=== 2019 ===
As of July 31, 2019, Red Frog Events announced that it will cease operations, and all scheduled races were cancelled. They offered no refund for anyone, took money from participants and continued to advertise, knowing they were going to close up shop. Red Frog has not responded to messages. Other races have attempted to fill the gap by offering free admission for those registered for a Warrior Dash that was cancelled.

== Registration ==
Registration for Warrior Dash takes place online prior to deadlines put forth by Red Frog Events. Pricing depends on location and the length of time until the event. All registrations close on the Tuesday before each specific event at 11:59 PM (CST).

With registration, each participant receives:

- Race bib
- As of 2014, races are self-timed.
- Warrior Dash participant T-shirt
- Warrior Dash helmet
- One free beer (for those who are of legal drinking age; redeemable by bib tear-off)
- Finisher medal
- Post-race snack and water

== Race Day ==
Race organizers provide parking on site or a free shuttle system from an off-site parking venue. Parking prices are currently $10 per car at each event. Warrior Dash organizers also provide a "Gear Check Tent" where participants are able to store belongings.

Runners gather in the start corral prior to their designated wave time. The course is roughly 5 kilometers long with at least 12 obstacles to overcome before reaching the finish line where they will receive a finisher medal, snack and water. The race is self-timed. There will be a clock at the start line. Racers are encouraged to bring a waterproof watch.

Warrior Dash provides additional forms of entertainment that vary at each event. Examples of such forms are axe-throwing contests, fireworks displays and chainsaw carving displays.

At each Warrior Dash, there are several awards presented to participants. Each participant is eligible to win awards for:

- Top three overall male and female times
- Top three males and females in each age division
- Best Warrior beard
- Best costume

== Charity partnerships ==
=== St. Jude ===
Each participant has the opportunity to raise funds for St. Jude's Children's Hospital. Warrior Dash does not contribute any portion of their revenue to St. Jude. Rather, all of the funds raised for St. Jude comes directly from the participants.

=== Fundraising opportunity ===
Warrior Dash provides monetary donations to local organizations that volunteer at events. By volunteering at Warrior Dash, local organizations such as athletic teams, nearby school and non-profit organizations are able to raise funds based on the number of group members who volunteer at Warrior Dash.

== Sponsorships ==
Warrior Dash has multiple national sponsors as well as local sponsorship opportunities on a market basis.

Sponsors in 2011 include Bear Naked and Monster Energy. A sample of additional sponsors are:

Sponsor
Pyramid Breweries
U.S. Marine Corps
Athletes Honey Milk
Pacific Monarch Resorts
Shock Top
Honest Tea
FUZE
Degree deodorant
Otterbox
Stanley

According to a 2010 Warrior Dash participant survey administered by Red Frog Events, Warrior Dash on average draws participants from 47 states and three countries. According to the National Association of Sports Commissions (NASC), direct spending on average by Warrior Dash attendees from one event is $4.5 million. Of this total, the average revenue generated is $1.3 million from hotel sales, $1.3 million from restaurant sales, $849,000 from local store sales and $823,000 from attendee gas sales.

The survey also reports on average 26.9% of attendees purchase local hotel rooms, 63% of attendees dine at local restaurants, 32% of attendees shop at local businesses and 23.5% of attendees purchase gas from local stations.

Indianapolis-based PROS Consulting LLC has estimated an impact of $4,875,392 from participants, as well as 168 jobs created from tourist spending.

== Closure of Red Frog Events ==
As of July 31, 2019, Red Frog events announced their closure and has cancelled all Warrior Dash races and ceased operations.

== See also ==
- Tough Mudder
- Run For Your Lives
- Rugged Maniac
- Spartan Race
