= Spartan Race =

Series of obstacle races

- Type: Private
- Industry: Obstacle Course Racing
- Founded: 2007
- Founder: Joe De Sena
- Headquarters: United States
- Website: Official website

Spartan Race is a series of obstacle races of varying difficulty, ranging from 3 miles to ultra-marathon distances of 50k+.

These races are held in the United States and have been franchised to 30 countries, including Canada, South Korea, Australia, the Philippines and several European countries. The series include the Spartan Sprint, the Spartan Super, the Spartan Beast, and the Spartan Ultra. Spartan Race has a military series that is hosted on military bases. In addition, unique events include winter races and team competitions.

== History ==
Spartan Race began as a spin-off of the "Death Race", a 48-hour endurance event founded in 2007. Spartan was founded by Joe De Sena, who intended for it to be a more manageable endurance race for a wider audience. The first Spartan Race event was held in 2010 at the Catamount Outdoor Center in Williston, Vermont and represented the city of Burlington, Vermont. Roughly 500 competitors had to "run, crawl, jump and swim" and overcome a variety of obstacles. All finishers received a medal, and prizes were awarded to the top athletes. First international event was held in 2012 Vechec, Slovakia with record breaking 700 competitors.

In 2012 Raptor Consumer Partners invested in the Spartan Race company. In 2013 Reebok had become the event title sponsor, and the races were renamed the "Reebok Spartan Race Series". On December 7, 2013, Universal Sports broadcast a special on the 2013 Spartan Race World Championships. In August 2015, parent network NBC then approved a Spartan-based television series, Spartan: Ultimate Team Challenge, led by the producers of fellow NBC series American Ninja Warrior. Later in 2015, Spartan Race founded the "Spartan Agoge" which is described as a "60 hour physical, tactical, mental and team based training and testing" event, to be held in Vermont twice a year. ESPN describes the Spartan Race as "a true test of will."

Spartan Race acquired Tough Mudder, which had been forced into involuntary bankruptcy proceedings, in February 2020. It purchased Tough Mudder assets for $700,000 and the assumption of debts, including honoring prepaid tickets, which was approved by the bankruptcy court for the District of Delaware. Tough Mudder was expected to continue its races, and the 2020 season started on April 17 in North London.

== Obstacle race ==
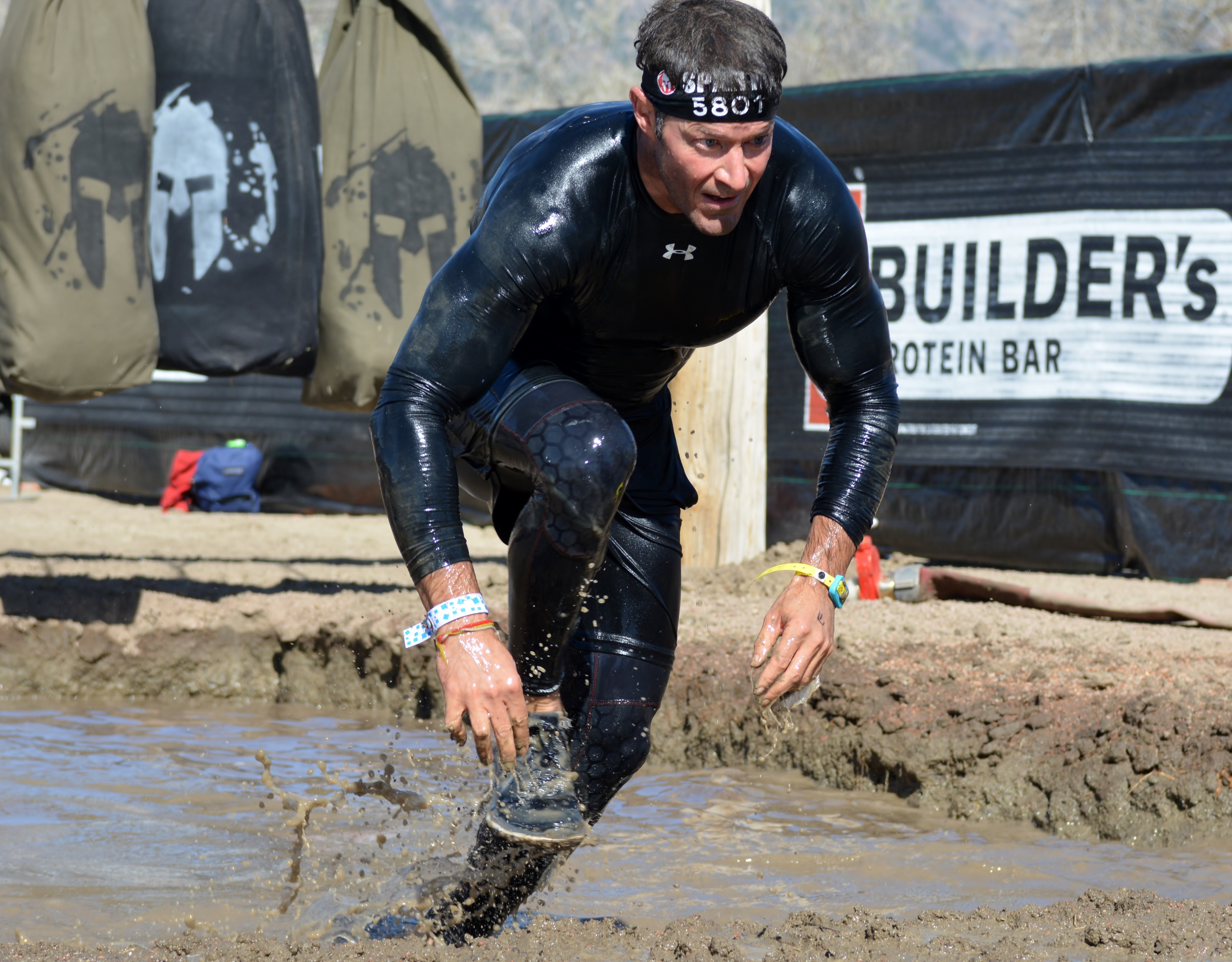
Spartan Race competitor

Spartan Race's main events include the Spartan Sprint (3+ miles of obstacle racing, 20+ obstacles), the Spartan Super (6+ miles, 25+ obstacles), the Spartan Beast (13+ miles, 30+ obstacles), and the Spartan Ultra (30+ miles, 60+ obstacles). The obstacles themselves also vary from race to race. Frequently presented obstacles can include a fire jump, climbing under barbed wire, wall climbing, mud crawling, the "over-under-through" (a series of obstacles in which runners must first climb over a wall, then under a wall, then through a square hole placed in a wall), spear throw, rope climb, heavy object carries, "Herculean Hoist", "Tyrolean traverse", monkey bars, Traversal Wall (similar to a bouldering wall), Hobie Hop (a thick rubber band is placed around the ankles and participants hop through consecutive tires), Slip Wall (a wall built at an incline, roughly covered in grease), a zig-zag log jump, steep mud climbs (rolling mud), tractor pulls, underwater submerging below walls (dunk walls), Atlas carries, tire flips, stump balances (skipping on stumps across a pond), rope swing, and the now discontinued Gladiator Arena.

Failure to fully complete any obstacles results in a 30-Burpee penalty (or in some cases, a penalty loop) that runners must complete before continuing their race. A participant can obtain a Trifecta medal after completing a Spartan Sprint (or Spartan Stadion), a Spartan Super, and a Spartan Beast in one calendar year. As of the 2016 season, the finisher medal includes both the traditional circular medal and a wedge – one-third of a larger Trifecta medal. Each Spartan event also provides races for children ages 4 to 13: half-mile races for ages 4–8, and one mile races for those older than 8.

The Spartan World Championships are held annually, and to qualify for the event, men and women must finish top 5 in a U.S. Championship Series event or a Regional Championship in their respective category.

Spartan World Champions

Event	Name
2012 Men's	Cody Moat (USA)
2012 Women's	Claude Godbout (Canada)
2013 Men's	Hobie Call (USA)
2013 Women's	Amelia Boone (USA)
2014 Men's	Jonathan Albon (UK)
2014 Women's	Claude Godbout (Canada)
2015 Men's	Robert Killian (USA)
2015 Women's	Zuzana Kocumova (Czech)
2016 Men's	Hobie Call (USA)
2016 Women's	Zuzana Kocumova (Czech)
2017 Men's	Cody Moat (USA)
2017 Women's	Lindsay Webster (Canada)
2017 Team	USA
2018 Men's	Jonathan Albon (UK)
2018 Women's	Lindsay Webster (Canada)
2018 Men's Team	Canada
2018 Women's Team	Canada
2019 Men's	Robert Killian (USA)
2019 Women's	Nicole Mericle (USA)
2021 Men's	Ryan Atkins (Canada)
2021 Women's	Lindsay Webster (Canada)

The 2017 Ultra World Championships were held in Iceland on Dec 14-Dec 17.

Spartan Ultra World Champions
Event	Name
2017 Men's	Joshua Fiore (USA)
2018 Women's	Morgan McKay (CAN)
2018 Men's	Ryan Atkins (CAN)
2018 Women's	Janka Pepova (SVK)
2019 Men's	Ryan Atkins (CAN)
2019 Women's	Rea Kolbl (Slovenia)

Spartan Trifecta World Championship
Event	Name
2018 Men's	Jonathan Albon (UK)
2018 Women's	Zuzana Kocumova (Czech)
2019 Men's	Richard Hynek (Czech)
2019 Women's	Nicole Mericle (USA)

Spartan Kids World Championship
Event	Name
2018 Boys	Tyson Brinkerhoff (USA)
2018 Girls	Avery Steyn (CAN)

The first Spartan Gym was opened in 2016, in the 1 Hotel in Miami. Additionally, Spartan Strong is a group fitness class offered exclusively at Life Time Fitness.

== Event Types ==
=== Race Events ===
==== Spartan Sprint ====
The Sprint combines relatively easy trail running with 20 obstacles, held on off-road terrain featuring water and mud along a 5-kilometer course, and is considered a short-distance race.

The Spartan Sprint is the first part of the Spartan Trifecta achievement, where participants are encouraged to complete 3 races, earning them The Ultimate Spartan Achievement.

==== Spartan Super ====
The Spartan Super has 25 to 30 obstacles along 6-8 miles (generally a 10k) of rugged terrain, and is considered a middle-distance race.

The Spartan Super is known to be significantly more difficult than the Spartan Sprint.

==== Spartan Beast ====
The Spartan Beast features 30 to 35 obstacles along 12 to 14 miles of rugged terrain.

The Spartan Beast is known to be the most difficult Spartan Race in terms of completing the trifecta; some participants can't finish and are marked as DNF.

==== Spartan Ultra ====
The Spartan Ultra features 60+ obstacles along 31+ miles of rugged terrain.

==== Spartan Kids Race ====
The Spartan Kids Race was created for boys and girls ages 4 to 13 to encourage exercising. The Kids Race is segmented into 3 different age groups:

1. Ages 4–6: ½ Mile with Obstacles
2. Ages 7-9: 1 Mile with Obstacles
3. Ages 10–13: 2 Mile with Obstacles
4. Ages 11–14: In select cities only, a 5 Mile Course with Obstacles

==== Spartan Trail ====
Spartan Trail is a trail running race that takes place in the wilderness with no obstacles. Races can be either a 10K or a half-marathon.

=== Series ===
==== Honor ====
The Honor Series made its debut in 2016. The races occur on military bases throughout the country and are open to current military, veterans, and the general public. The course runs from 4–5 miles and contains obstacles similar to the other races.

==== Stadium (Stadion) ====
These events are typically three-mile sprint-style races with more than 15 obstacles, and are held at baseball and football stadiums across the United States. The name stadion (or stade, Ancient Greek: στάδιον) is drawn from an ancient running event, part of the Ancient Olympic Games and the other Panhellenic Games.

Some of the stadium-themed obstacles include:

- The Batting Order: A series of obstacles and exercises to be completed quickly.
- Foul Ball: The participant is to carry a sandbag a specific distance across the field.
- Seventh Inning Stretch: The participant must run up and down stairs in the stadium, and then must rope climb afterwards.

==== Global Championship Series ====
The annual Spartan Global Championship Series unfolds across more than 40 countries on the road to the Spartan World Championship. The series sees competitors facing off on the course, battling signature Spartan obstacles on varying terrains and natural conditions.

Format: 14 National Series around the world lead into stand-alone championship events in five regions paving the road to the Spartan World Championship. Elite and Age Group competitors must qualify for Regional Championships and the World Championship.

=== Endurance Events ===
==== Ultra ====
A hybrid of race and endurance events, the Ultra covers 30+ miles of terrain and features close to 70 obstacles. The Ultra is the only Spartan event featuring strict time cutoffs that must be met; competitors are warned that not all who sign up will finish.

Competitors are encouraged to bring ‘Transition Containers’ to supply the participant with food and water at the halfway point of the race due to the general tenacity of the course.

==== Hurricane Heat (4-8, 12-, and 24-hour) ====
The Hurricane Heat Endurance Event was created in August 2011 due to the cancellation of a prior Spartan Race caused by Hurricane Irene. In the Hurricane Heat, the goal is for the competitors’ teams to reach the finish line; individual times are not applicable. The Hurricane Heat is composed of 4–8, 12, and 24 hour courses. Each Hurricane Heat event is unique to the others in terms of obstacles and location.

==== Agoge ====
Spartan Race brings a fully immersive training program that balances class time with hands-on practical application of those skills and lessons. It is named after the ancient Greek agoge. The Spartan Agoge is held on The Farm in Pittsfield, Vermont, twice a year in the summer and winter—and in historic locations across the globe including Iceland, Mongolia, Isle of Skye in Scotland, and along the Great Wall of China.

== Media ==
“Spartan on NBC Sports” is a five-race U.S. Championship series that airs on NBC Sports Network and regional Comcast Sports Network stations while the World Championship is broadcast on NBC. The 2017 Spartan World Championship was December 24, 2017.

In 2016, Spartan launched an editorial website, Spartan Life, which features fitness, nutrition, and lifestyle content.

In 2018, Spartan launched a series: “Spartan: The Championship Series,“ on ESPN and ESPN 2, which is a five-episode series, and features all the action from Spartan's championship events.

== See also ==
- Ironman Triathlon
- Rugged Maniac
