= Joe De Sena =

Chief executive officer

- Born: January 2, 1969 (age 57); Queens, New York
- Education: Cornell University
- Occupation: Business owner
- Known for: Co-Founder of Death Race and Spartan Race
- Notable work: Spartan Up: A Take-No-Prisoners Guide to Overcoming Obstacles and Achieving Peak Performance in Life
- Television: Spartan: Ultimate Team Challenge

Joe De Sena (born January 2, 1969) is the CEO and founder of Spartan and the Death Race. He is also a NY Times best selling author of Spartan Up, Spartan Fit and The Spartan Way.

== Early life ==
Joe De Sena grew up in Howard Beach, Queens, with his mother Jean, a yoga aficionado, and his father, Ralph was a business owner. De Sena built a small business around selling fireworks, and then a t-shirt sales business at a young age. Joe later began a pool cleaning business while a teenager, where he earned 750 customers in his local area. Joe eventually moved with his mother and sister to Ithaca, NY, and four years out of high school he attended Cornell University. He eventually restarted the pool cleaning business and later sold it for $500,000. Following this, he began a career on Wall Street. At a brokerage firm De Sena worked as an equities and derivatives trader and engaged various outdoor activities ranging from multiple IronMan races, to the Iditarod by foot.

== Racing career ==
De Sena first became interested in long-distance events after gaining weight while holding his desk job, and trying to reverse the process through running the stairs of his apartment building. He later moved to Vermont in order to continue a private stock trading business. He moved his family as well to Pittsfield, Vermont to operate a farm, a bed and breakfast, and a general store for hikers that he purchased. Here he became an ultramarathon runner and began to compete in other long-distance events. This included athletic events like the Ironman and the Furnace Creek 508 Bike Race, as De Sena competed in several hundred extreme races after moving. In one year, De Sena completed fifty ultra events and fourteen Ironmans.

== Spartan Race ==
In 2000, De Sena's team became stranded in the Quebec wilderness during a 350-mile winter adventure race, when he had to dig himself beneath the snow to survive. It was here that he claims he made a distinction between "difficult" situations and "desperate" experience and inspired him to create his own endurance races. De Sena decided to develop a new series of obstacle course races and cofounded the Death Race. The first edition in 2007 saw only eight competitors, with three completing the race. The original race is still held at De Sena's farm, where in 2014 only forty of three hundred entrants completed the race. He also hosts individuals at his farm for long-term personalized outdoor training. In 2008 De Sena began the Peak.com Corporation to promote endurance sports, including Peak and Spartan.

In addition to running the Death Race and Peak.com De Sena founded the Spartan in 2009 as a less strenuous obstacle course test. He is currently serving as the company's CEO. In August 2012, the Raptor Group, an equity firm run by Jim Pallotta, invested in Spartan with John Burns from Raptor Consumer Partners joining the Board of Directors for Spartan. Spartan continues to grow and currently hosts more than 200 events in 40 countries across the world, with over one million annual participants. The new venture began as Spartan Race unveiled a new stadium series of races beginning with Fenway Park. In 2013, Spartan Race expanded the stadium series to include CITI Field, Miller and AT&T parks.

== Writing ==
De Sena is a contributor to publications including Entrepreneur. In 2014 he published the book Spartan Up: A Take-No-Prisoners Guide to Overcoming Obstacles and Achieving Peak Performance in Life, co-authored with Jeff O'Connell. In 2016 he followed up that book with Spartan Fit!: 30 Days. Transform Your Mind. Transform Your Body. Commit to Grit. No Gym Required., and in 2018 he added The Spartan Way: Eat Better. Train Better. Think Better. Be Better. De Sena is also the host of the The Hard Way With Joe De Sena podcast, on which he interviews various public figures on their achievements.

== Business Career ==
In 2010, De Sena is said to have assisted in the extraction of Matthew Kaufman Venezia from New York City after a contract (hit) was reportedly taken out against him. Venezia, then active in the New York technology and startup community (including work connected to RootZoo), had allegedly faced targeted threats; De Sena's involvement, reportedly drawing on his prior Wall Street and New York connections, facilitated Venezia's departure from the city.
