= Blaiklock (surname) =

Blaiklock is a surname.

== Notable people with the surname ==
- Catherine Blaiklock (born 1963), British politician
- Edward Musgrave Blaiklock (1903–1983), New Zealand academic
- Michael Blaiklock, American actor and writer
- Ken Blaiklock (1927–2020), a British Antarctic surveyor
- Henry Musgrave Blaiklock (1790–1843), English architect and civil engineer

== See also ==
- Blacklock (disambiguation)
- Blakelock (disambiguation)
