= Blacklock =

Blacklock is a surname of Scottish and English origin, also used as a given name. Notable people with the name include:

== As a given name ==
- James Blacklock Henderson (1871-1950), British naval architect

== As a surname ==
=== Sport ===
- Arthur Blacklock (1868-1934), New Zealand cricketer
- Beth Blacklock (born 1997), British rugby union player
- Bill Blacklock (1883-1942), Australian rules footballer
- Bob Blacklock (1865-1897), New Zealand cricketer
- Carne Blacklock (1884-1924), New Zealand cricketer
- Charlie Blacklock (1908-1935), New Zealand motorcycle speedway rider
- Hugh Blacklock (1893–1954), professional American football offensive tackle in the National Football League
- James Blacklock (cricketer, born 1883) (1883-1935), New zealand cricketer
- James William Blacklock (1855-1907), New Zealand cricketer
- Joseph Blacklock (1878-1945), British rugby union & league player
- Nathan Blacklock (born 1976), Australian former rugby league, and rugby union footballer
- Ray Blacklock (1955-2020), Australian rugby league footballer
- Ross Blacklock (born 1997), American football player

=== Other ===
- Ambrose Blacklock (1784–1866), Scottish-born farmer, physician and political figure in Upper Canada
- Charlotte Blacklock (1857–1931), British suffragette, given a Hunger Strike Medal
- Craig Blacklock (born 1954), nature photographer best known for his book The Lake Superior Images
- Jimmy Blacklock (born 1980), American lawyer
- Judith Blacklock, author of five books on floral design, teacher, and regular arranger of the flowers at Kensington Palace
- Nadine Blacklock (1953–1998), nature photographer best known for her detailed nature photography of the Lake Superior area
- Norman Blacklock KCVO OBE FRCS (1928–2006), surgeon in the Royal Navy, later professor of medicine at Manchester University
- Thomas Blacklock (1721–1791), blind Scottish poet and ordained minister
- Wendy Blacklock, Australia-based theatre and TV actor, who played Edie MacDonald in the 1970s TV soap opera Number 96
- William James Blacklock (1816–1858), English landscape painter, painting scenery in Cumbria and the Scottish Borders

== See also ==
- Blakelock (disambiguation)
- Blaiklock (disambiguation)
- Blacklock (horse), a Thoroughbred racehorse
- Blacklock Elementary School, public elementary school in Langley, British Columbia part of School District 35 Langley
- William Blacklock House, built in 1800, is one of the United States' most important Adamesque houses
