= Blaiklock =

Blaiklock may refer to:

== People ==
- Catherine Blaiklock (born 1963), British politician
- Edward Musgrave Blaiklock (1903–1983), New Zealand academic
- Michael Blaiklock, American actor and writer
- Ken Blaiklock (1927–2020), a British Antarctic surveyor
- Henry Musgrave Blaiklock (1790–1843), English architect and civil engineer

== Geography ==
- Blaiklock River, a tributary of the Barlow River in Québec, Canada
- Blaiklock Island, an island in Antarctica.
- Blaiklock Glacier, a glacier in Antarctica.

== See also ==
- Blacklock (disambiguation)
- Blakelock (disambiguation)
