= Floral design =

Artistic design of flowers and plants for decoration

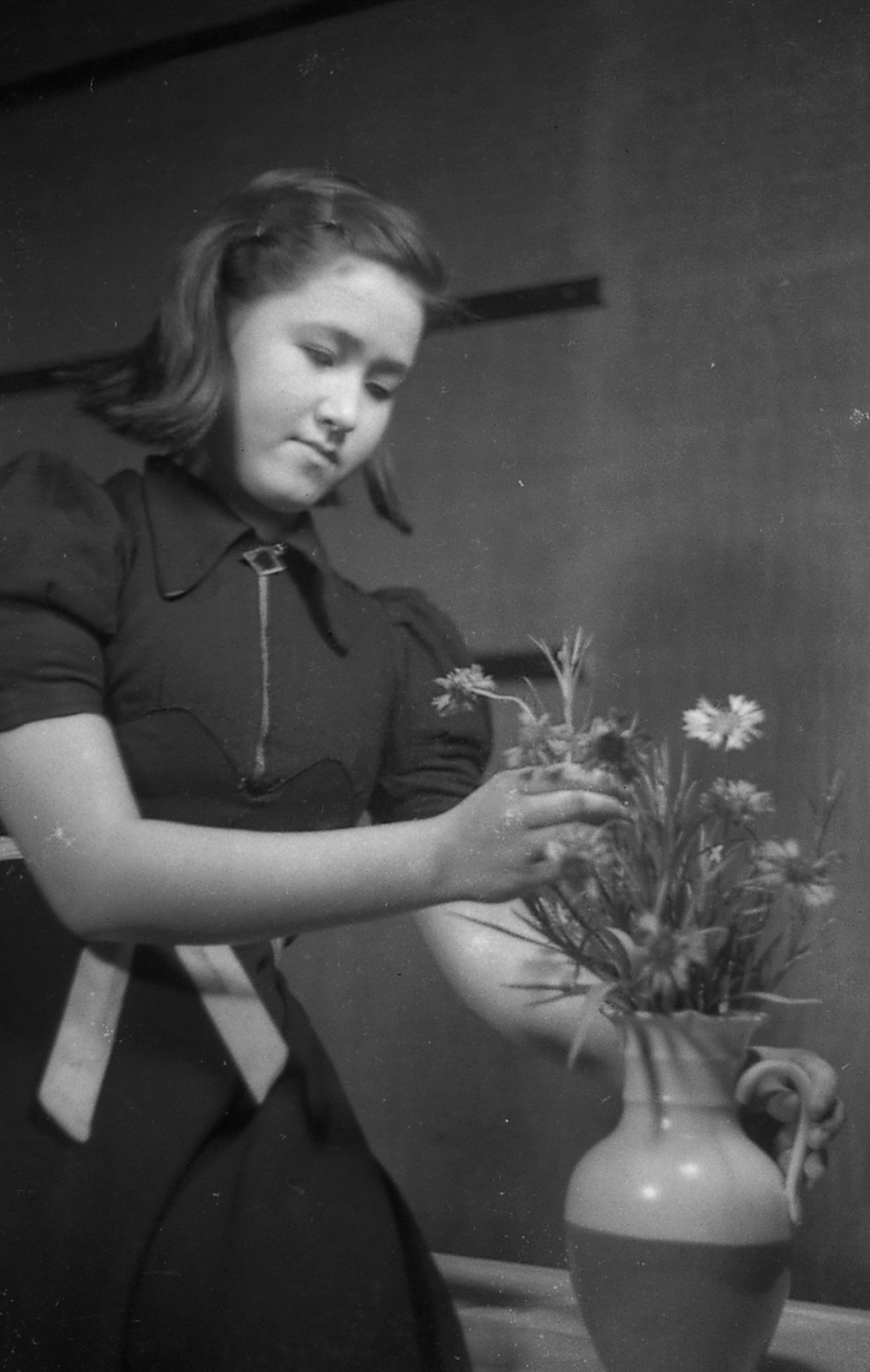
A woman creating a flower arrangement in the 1930s in Tokyo, Japan

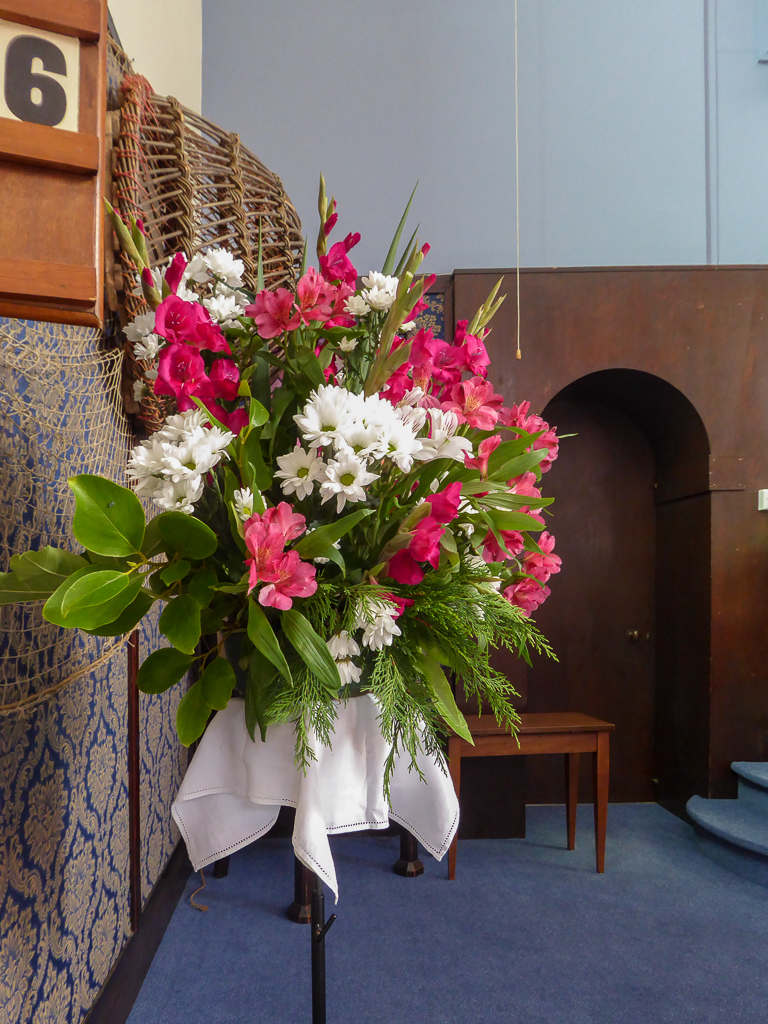
An arrangement displayed at a church in Beer, United Kingdom

Floral design or flower arrangement is the art of using plant material and flowers to create an eye-catching and balanced composition or display. Evidence of refined floral design is found as far back as the culture of ancient Egypt. Floral designs, called arrangements, incorporate the five elements and seven principles of floral design.

Floral design is considered a section of floristry. But floral design pertains only to the design and creation of arrangements. It does not include the marketing, merchandising, caring of, growing of, or delivery of flowers.

Common flower arrangements in floral design include vase arrangements, wreaths, nosegays, garlands, festoons, boutonnieres, corsages, and bouquets.

== History ==
The Eastern, Western, and European styles have all influenced the commercial floral design industry as it is today. Western design historically is characterized by symmetrical, asymmetrical, horizontal, and vertical style of arrangements. The history of flower arrangement first dates back to Ancient Egypt, and has gradually evolved over time.

=== Ancient civilizations ===
Egyptians were among the first to place lotus flowers and buds in vases nearly 4,000 years ago. Egyptians also created bouquets, wreaths, garlands, headwear, and collars. These arrangements often used lotus and papyrus, as they were seen as sacred plants to the goddess Isis. Ancient Greeks and Romans also created garlands and wreaths to wear. Greeks and Romans also created cornucopias full of fruits and vegetables as religious offerings.

=== Asia ===
Chinese and Korean arrangements were, and still are, traditionally based upon the Confucian idea of reflection, the Buddhist principle of preservation, and Taoist symbolism. The arrangements of the Chinese and Koreans often use containers of varying height and shape, and use natural elements, such as rocks.

Ikebana is the Japanese style of floral design, and incorporates the three main line placements that correspond with heaven, humans, and the earth.

=== Europe ===
During the Renaissance, pieces often had a degree of symbolism and used bright, vivid, and contrasting triadic colors. Designs were symmetrical and combined fresh and dried material, as well as fruits and vegetables. These arrangements were often triangular, arching, or ellipse-shaped.

In French design, arrangements often used soft pastel colors. Arrangements were often light and airy, and stressed the individual beauty of each flower itself, rather than the entire arrangement. Pieces were semi-ovoid, soft and airy, had a feminine design, were symmetrical, and had no focal point. They accentuated rhythm with curves, lines, and flourishes of plant material.

English design drew from the vast variety of plant materials that were available in estates and the countryside. Most arrangements during the various periods were formal pieces, generally triangular in shape, and symmetrical.

=== The Americas ===
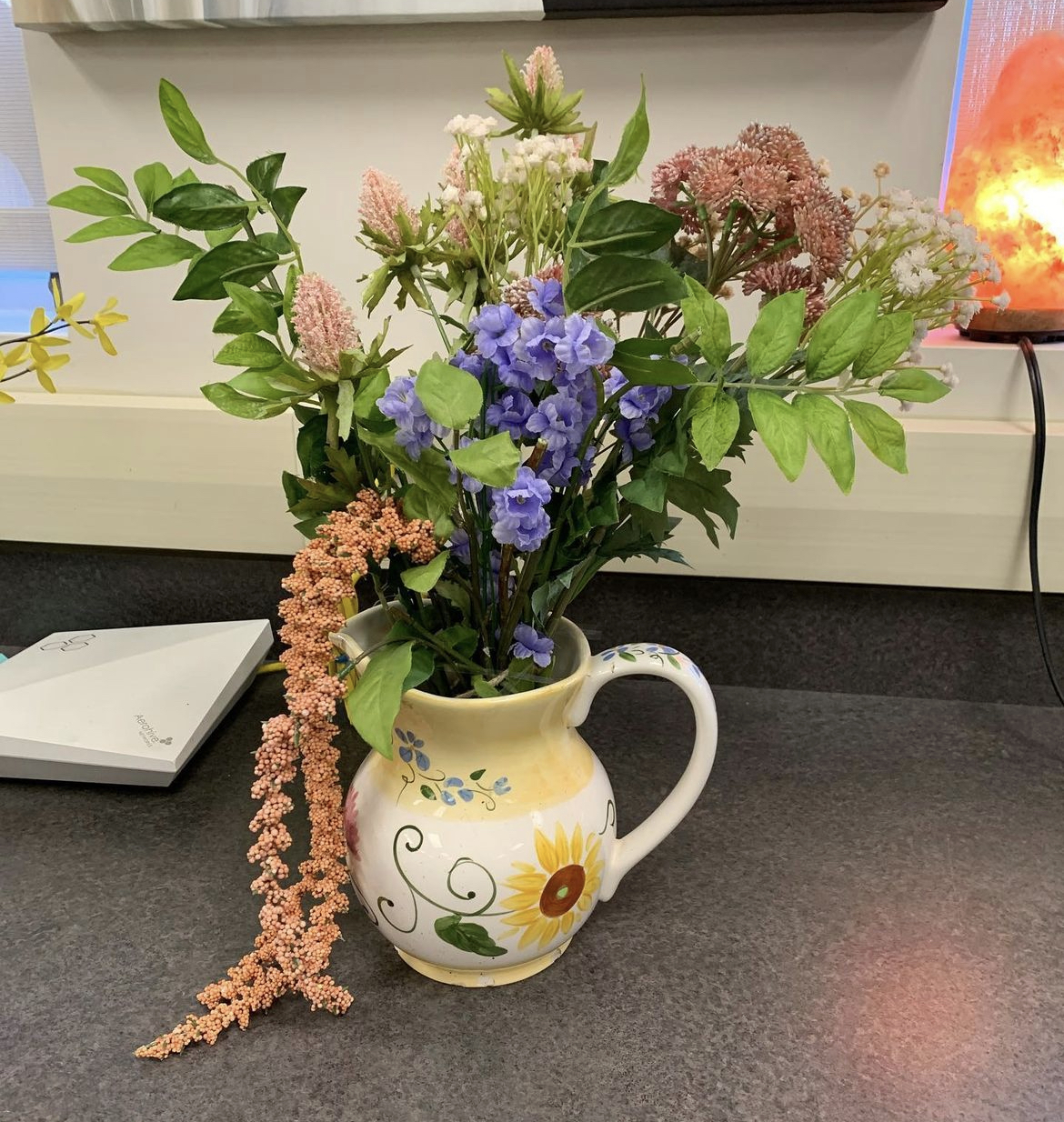
A recreation of an American Colonial Period arrangement using synthetic flowers

In the Americas, during the Colonial Period (1607–1699), arrangements were made used gathered wildflowers, grasses, and seed pods. These arrangements reflected a simplistic lifestyle with few luxuries; a reflection of the first colonists to arrive there. American arrangements then evolved from numerous influences, primarily European. As such, American pieces began to reflect the sophistication, symmetry, and shapes of European design ideals of the time.

=== Modern day ===
In the mid 20th century, flower arranging and floral design came to be seen as an art form. While modern floral designers and arrangers are still inspired by the naturalistic, 19th century designs, modern designers tend to want to break free from the rigid patterns and restrictions of past period designs. This led to the creation of abstract designs in modern floral arrangement. Other modern designers, however, did not feel inspired or drawn to abstract designs. As such, these designers began to create new design styles. Today's floral arrangements are born out of these two factors. Modern arrangements range from zero abstraction, in which pieces and components are untreated and organized naturally, to total abstraction, which totally disregards patterns and rules.

Today, there are many styles of floral design including the Botanical Style, the Garden Style (Hand Tied, Compote or Armature), the Crescent Corsage, the Nosegay Corsage, Pot au Fleur, the Inverted "T", Parallel Systems, Western Line, the Hedgerow Design, Mille de Fleur, and Formal Linear.

== Design ==
=== Principles ===
When creating flower arrangements, there are generally seven principles that floral designers must incorporate into their arrangement to create a flattering and appealing piece. These seven principles include:

- Proportion: the relationship between the sizes of elements used to create the design (e.g., flowers, foliage, vase, accessories).
- Scale: the relationship between the overall size of the design and the setting it is placed in.
- Balance: contains physical balance and visual balance. Physical balance is the distribution of materials and weight across the arrangement; the arrangement should be stable and not at risk of falling over. Visual balance is the poise an arrangement contains upon first glance. There are three types of visual balance: symmetrical, asymmetrical, and open.
- Focal point: the main feature of the design and/or the first thing that attracts the viewer's eye.
- Rhythm: the visual flow of the arrangement. This element should encourage the viewer's gaze to move inward, outward, up, and down while looking at the arrangement. Achieved through colors, shapes, lines, textures, and spaces.
- Harmony: the pleasing combination of colors, material, and texture used in the arrangement.
- Unity: everything is placed with purpose; achieved when the other 6 principles are in order.

It is important to keep in mind that not every arrangement will use all seven principles of design. For example, French Baroque and Rococo style arrangements do not include a focal point. Rococo designs also disregarded proportion; they were to be much taller than they were wide. Some traditional designs disregarded space (and therefore a part of rhythm). Modern abstract designers may disregard the seven principles entirely.

=== Elements ===
In addition to the seven principles, there are also five elements of design a designer must keep in mind when arranging flowers. These five elements include:

- Line: provides the shape and structure for the design. Line also creates paths for the viewer's eye to follow when viewing the arrangement. Lines can defined (clearly visible) or implied (suggested by changes in color, tone, and texture). Line helps build the dimensions and overall shape of the design.
- Color: the color of the arrangement. There are numerous color schemes, such as monochromatic, triadic, analogous, or complimentary. Different color schemes provide different effects on the feel of the arrangement.
- Form: the height, width, and depth of the arrangement. Form also helps build the dimensions and overall shape of the design, much like Line.
- Space: the spacing of flowers, foliage, and other materials. Space ensures every flower is visible, and that the design is not too clumpy, constricted, spaced out, or empty.
- Texture: the different textures used in an arrangement. Texture gives the arrangement diversity and interest. Texture is one way a floral designer can achieve rhythm. Textures can be smooth, wrinkled, rough, glossy, etc.

== Media ==
=== Fresh ===
The vast majority of the media used in floral design is fresh, or living, media. Fresh media includes flowers and foliage.

==== Flowers ====
Flowers used in floral design are often broke into four categories: line flowers, form flowers, mass flowers, and filler flowers. Each category serves its own purpose in achieving an element or principle of design. The four categories are listed as follows:

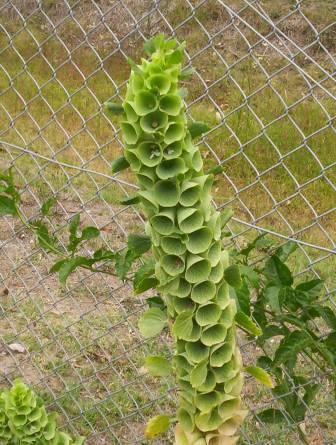
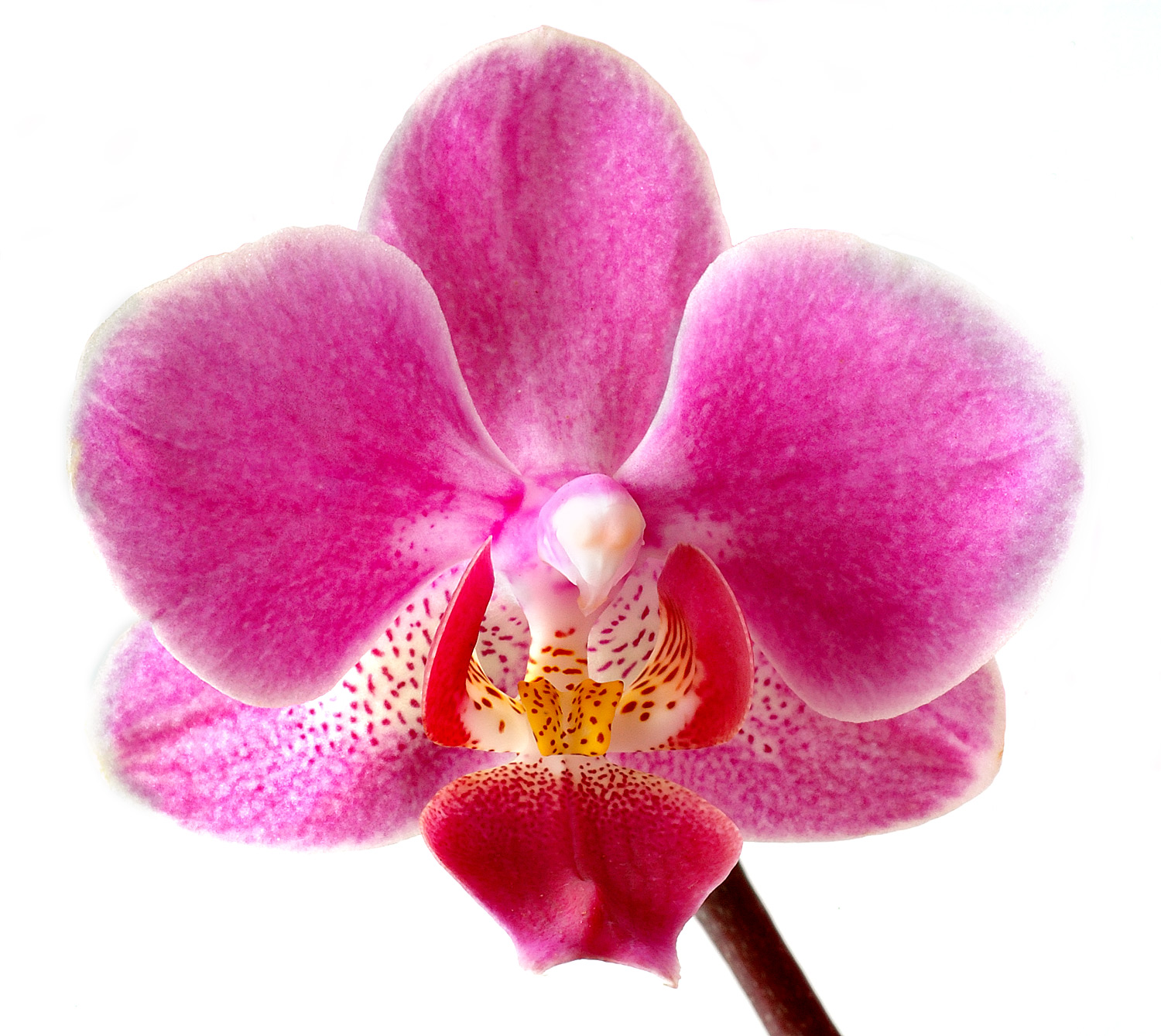
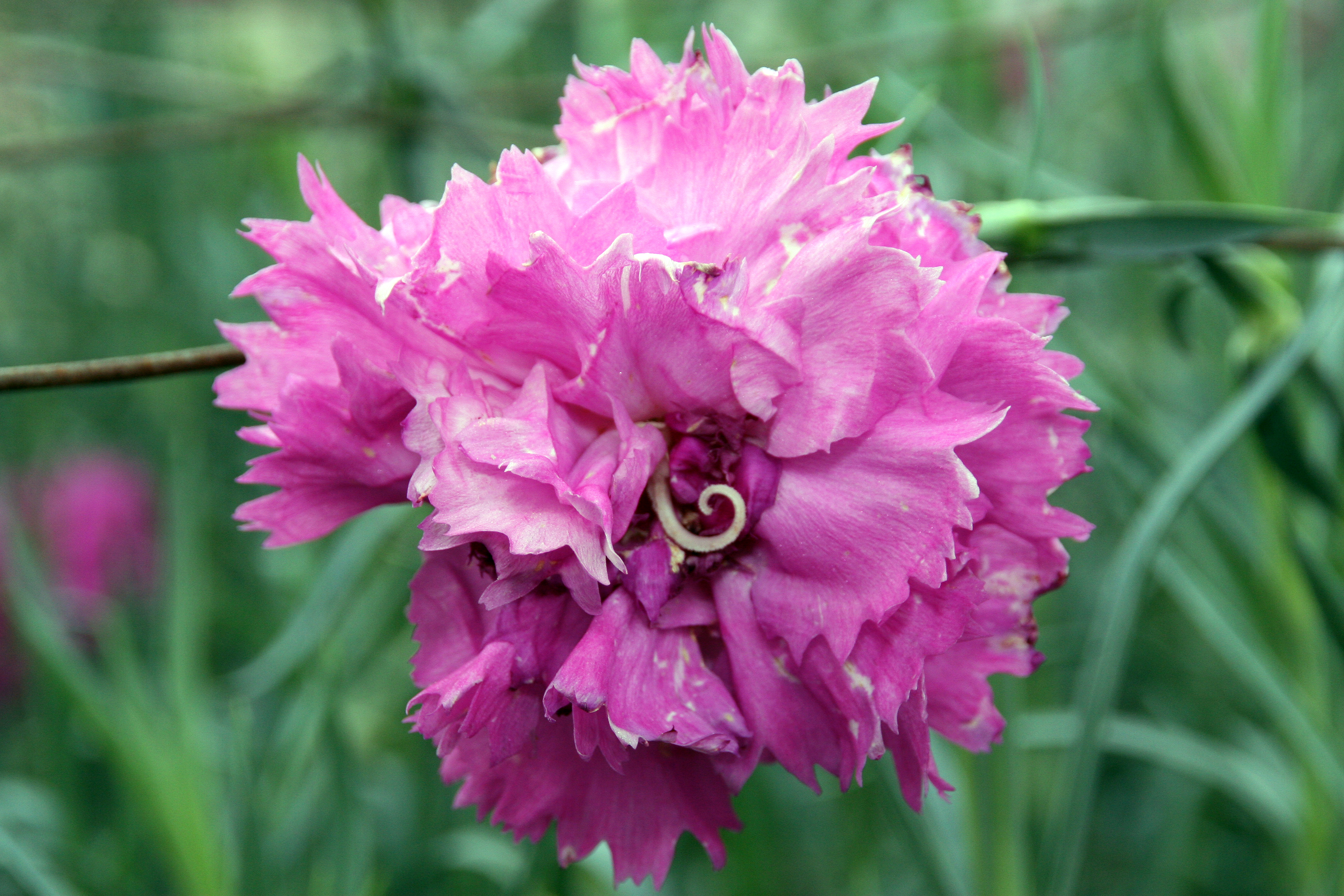
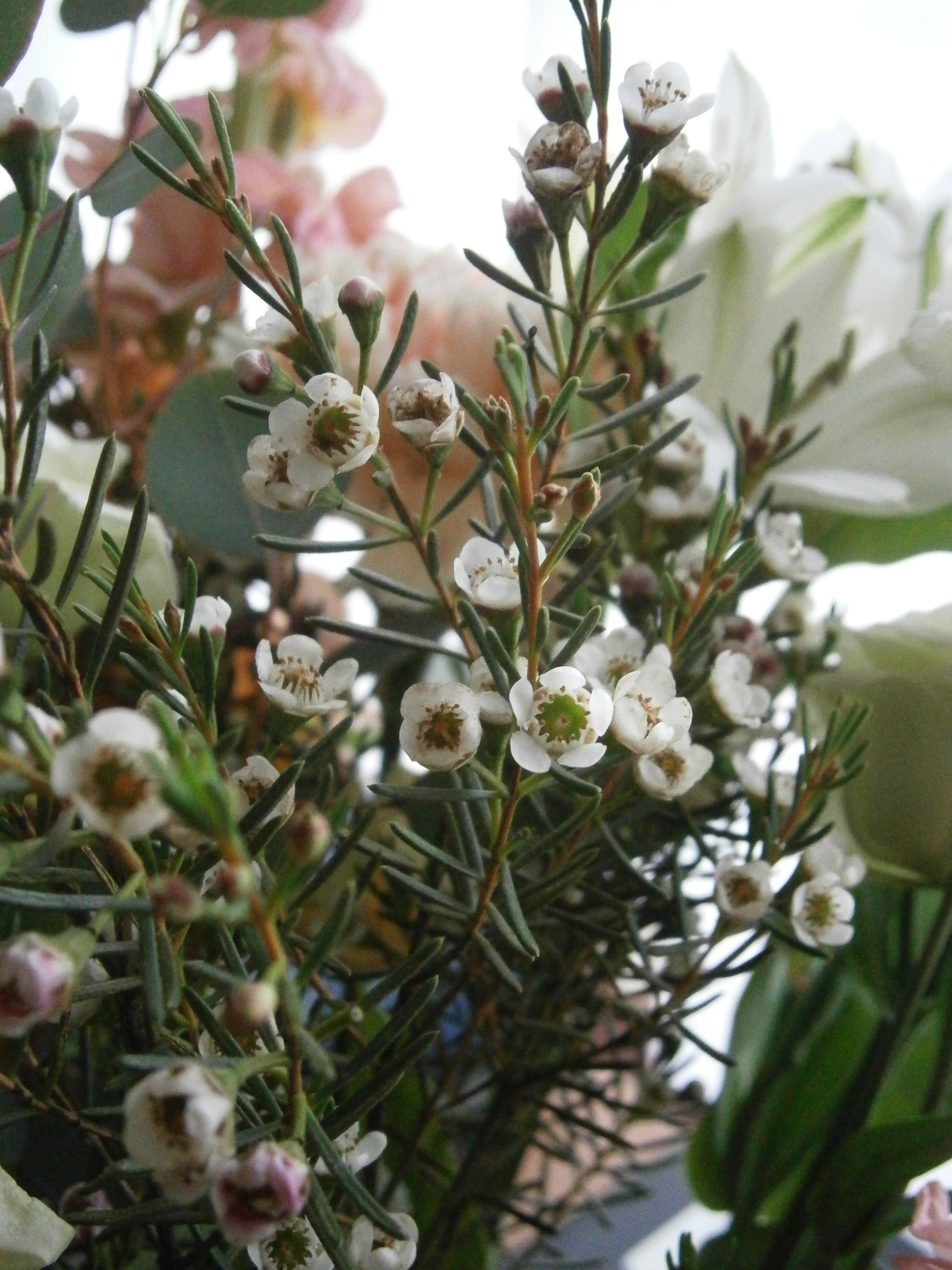
Examples for each category of flowers. Clockwise, from upper left: Bells of Ireland (line flower), moth orchid (form flower), waxflower (filler flower), carnation (mass flower).
- Line flowers are tall spikes of flowers that bloom along the stem of the plant. They create the outline for an arrangement and determine the height and width of the design. They can be straight, or naturally curving. Most line flowers have larger flowers at the bottom of the stem, that gradually become smaller the closer they are located to the end of the spike. This creates rhythm in the design, as the eye naturally follows the progression. Examples of line flowers include snapdragons, delphiniums, liatris, gladiolus, stock, cattails, and pussywillows.
- Form flowers are flowers that have interesting colors, textures, and/or patterns that draw attention and stand out among the other pieces in the arrangement. They are most often used as the focal point of the arrangement. Form flowers include irises, calla lilies, anthurium, and orchids.
- Mass flowers consist of a single stem with one solid, rounded head at the top of the stem. They add mass and visual weight to an arrangement. Mass flowers are often inserted near the rim of the container to draw attention to the focal point, or to serve as the focal point themselves. Mass flowers are often considered the "star of the show" in an arrangement. Oftentimes, more than one type of mass flower is used to create variety and to avoid monotony, or, to otherwise make the arrangement less boring. Mass flowers include carnations, chrysanthemums, daisies, anemone, dahlias, hydrangeas, and roses.
- Filler flowers are composed of small "sprays" of flowers. Filler flowers are used, as the name suggests, to fill in empty spaces among mass flowers and the framework of the design. Filler flowers also add further dimension to the arrangement. Examples of filler flowers are baby's breath and statice.

Just because a flower is defined in one category, that does not exclude it from other categories. For example, chrysthanthemums can be considered both a mass flower or a filler flower, depending on the size and variety of the bloom. Anthuriums and orchids can be considered form flowers, as well as mass flowers.

Other flowers commonly used by floral designers include Peruvian lilies, cosmos, freesias, gardenia, hyacinth, kalanchoe, larkspur, lavender, lilac, lilies, limonium, lupine, peonies, phlox, protea, ranunculus, sedum, solidago, sunflowers, tulips, and zinnias.

==== Foliage ====
Much like flowers, foliage can also be divided into the same four categories. Usually, they are meant to accent what is being done by their flower counterparts.

- Line foliages are effective for repeating and complimenting lines established by the line flowers. This creates repetition and unity within the arrangement. Much like line flowers, they can also be straight or curved. Examples of line foliage include bear grass, flax, ivy, and flat ferns, such as sword fern.
- Form foliages also have unique textures, patterns, or colors that allow them to shine through and stand out in an arrangement. Form foliage are often used to achieve the element of space. They also are used to drag the viewer's eye to the focal point. Form foliages include seeded eucalyptus, Calathea, Equisetum, Diffenbachia, and Galax.
- Mass foliages have the same purpose as mass flowers: to add mass and visual weight to the arrangement. However, they are also effective in filling empty space not occupied by flowers and hiding the mechanics of the design (e.g., floral foam, pot tape, etc.). Mass foliages include leatherleaf fern and salal.
- Filler foliages are used as accents to create harmony and unity. Depending on the texture of the filler foliage, there can be different effects on the feel of the arrangements. Fillers like plumosa asparagus and sprengeri fern lighten and soften, whereas coarse textures of plants like huckleberry and boxwood create contrast.

Another similarity shared in the categorization of foliage in the same way as flowers is that a certain type of foliage may be included in more than one category. Leatherleaf fern can be considered a mass foliage or a line foliage, and Ruscus can be considered form foliage or a line foliage.

Other foliage used by floral designers today include Italian ruscus, Israeli ruscus, dusty miller, Monstera deliciosa, eucalyptus (including silver dollar, gunnii, and baby blue), various types of ferns (such as tree fern), Camellia, olive branches, hypericum berries, and Pittosporum.

=== Preserved ===
Dried materials such as bark, wood, dried flowers, dried (and often aromatic) inflorescences, leaves, leaf skeletons, and other preserved materials are common extensions of the art and media of floral design. They are of practical importance in that they last indefinitely and are independent of the seasons. Their materials offer effects and associations complementary to, and contrasting with, fresh flowers and foliage.

== Tools ==
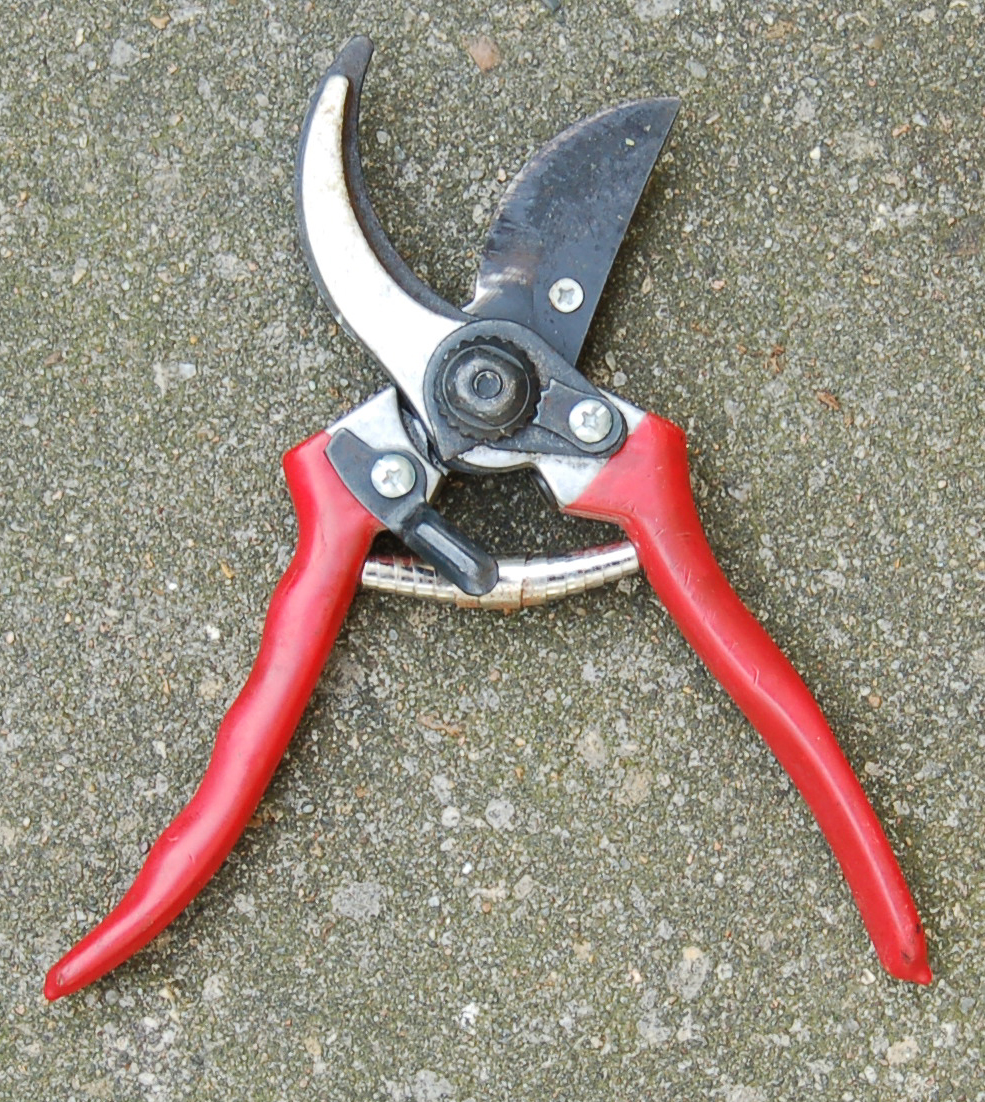
An example of shears that can be used in floral design

To create an arrangement, a floral designer has to use a multitude of tools. In general, the most common tools are floral tape, pot tape, glue, flower frogs, cutting tools, floral foam, containers, and wire.

Vases and other containers are used to hold the arrangement. They often lend to the final look of a piece, and come in a variety of shapes and sizes to suit numerous types of projects.

Floral foam is a piece of dense foam that holds moisture and keeps flowers in place. Most floral foam has a specific container that can hold the foam without anything more than placing it into the container. However, floral foam can be cut into any shape, and therefore placed in any container. In recent years, there has been controversy over the environmental impact of floral foam, as well as the potential negative health effects from inhaling the powder created from unsoaked foam. Nevertheless, floral foam is still an essential tool in floral design.

Cutting tools, such as floral knives, floral shears, pruners, and ribbon scissors can be used to cut a variety of materials in floral design. Knives can be used to cut flowers or floral foam. Shears and pruners can also be used to trim and cut foliage and flowers. Ribbon scissors are used to cut ribbon and twine.

Adhesive tools include floral tape, pot tape, floral adhesive (also known as cold glue), and hot glue. Floral tape is most often used to secure flowers together or to cover the mechanics of an arrangement, especially when creating a boutonniere or corsage. Pot tape is used to create a grid pattern in vases, which helps keeps flowers and foliage in place. Pot tape can also be used to secure floral foam to a container. Cold glue is used to secure fresh, living flowers together or in place for an arrangement. Hot glue is used to glue non-living media in place or together.

Wire is used in floral design for a variety of purposes. It can be used to secure ribbons in place, fix broken stems, or provide strength to weak or flimsy material. Wire comes in different gauges, or sizes, which are used for different applications.

Flower frogs are devices that keep flowers upright. They usually have holes to place the flowers into, or spikes to "spear" the cut end of the flower into.

== Education ==
With the ever-growing interest in the natural world and flowers, the floral industry continues to grow. The increase in educational institutes providing training in floral design has expanded to many state universities, certified design schools, and even high schools worldwide. Schools that teach floral design courses teach techniques to arrange flowers, plant identification, foliage and flower care for both fresh and preserved media, retail floral shop practices, and how to place and receive flower orders. Most of these programs reward students with certificates or degrees in floral design, shop management, or artisanship.

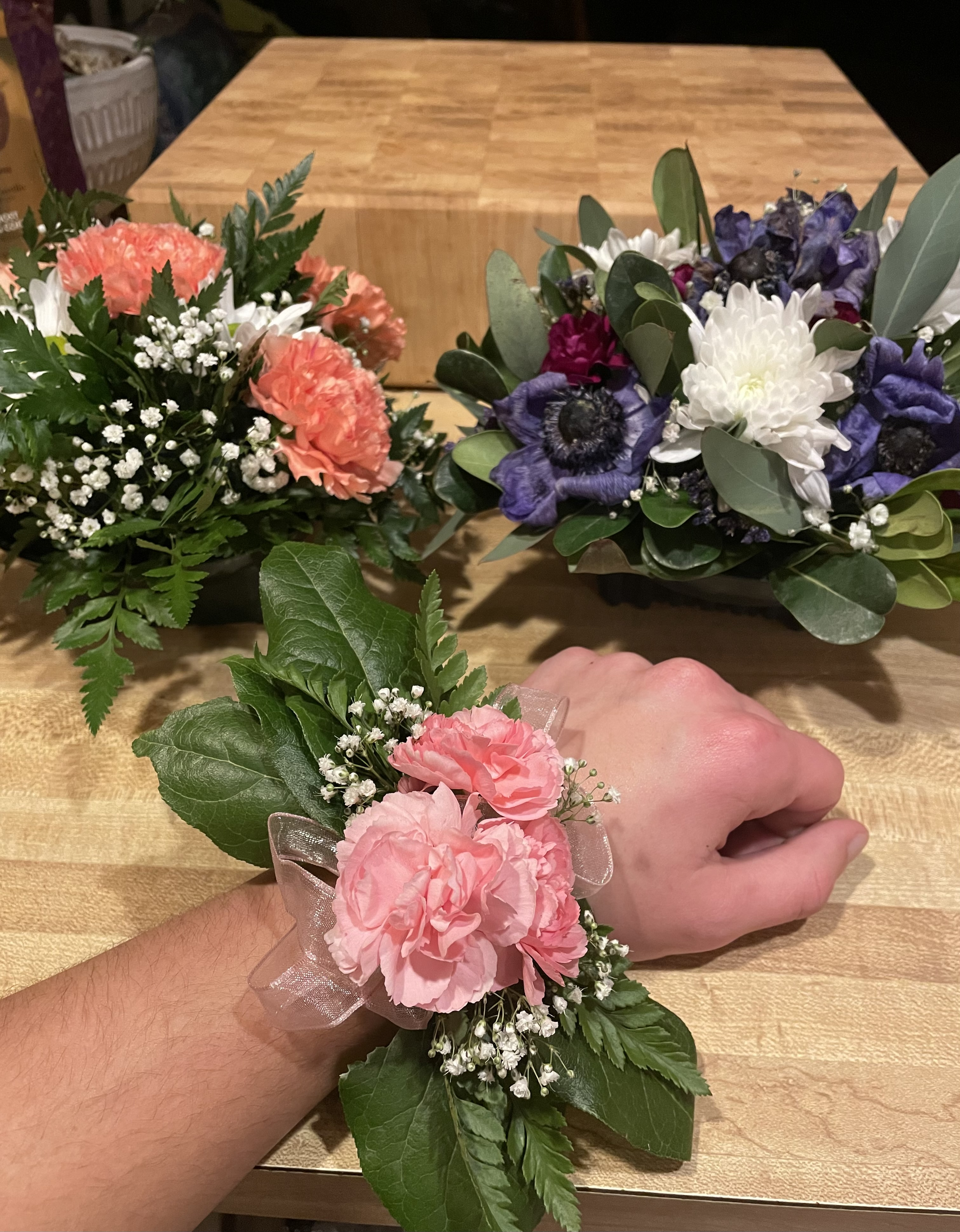
Collection of arrangements created by a high school floral design student. This photo shows two round arrangements and a corsage.

Floral design course are typically cheaper than most higher education programs, and can cost anywhere from US$125 to over US$25,000. Most courses take around six to eighteen months to complete.

The following list is composed of schools and organizations that offer floral design courses:

- American Institute of Floral Designers
- Anne Arundel Community College
- British Florist Association
- California Polytechnic State University
- Hong Kong Academy of Flower Arrangement
- Golden West College
- Jackson High School (Stark County, Ohio)
- Judith Blacklock Flower School
- Mississippi State University
- New York Institute of Art & Design
- Nobleman School of Floral Design
- Rittners School of Floral Design
- Texas State Florists Association
- Texas Tech University School of Floral Design
- The London Flower School

== Community ==
=== Floral shops ===
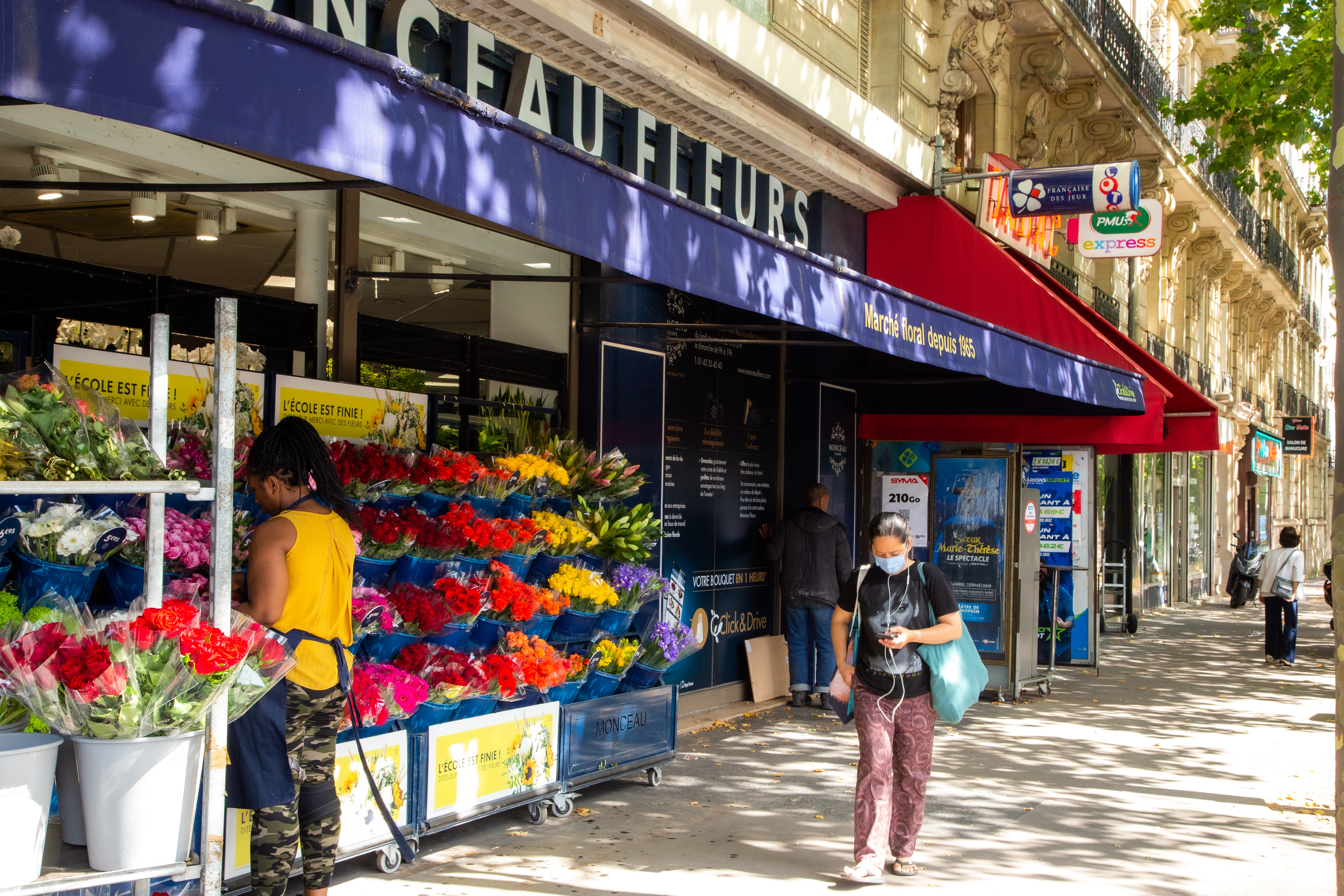
A florist's shop in Paris

Floral shops are business establishments that create and sell floral designs. Floral shops often have a vast variety of flowers and foliage to use in creating arrangements, which can be custom ordered or pre-designed. Floral shops usually receive a majority of their business on the following holidays and events: Christmas, Valentine's Day, Administrative Professionals' Day, Mothers' Day, All Souls Day, Advent, Easter, weddings and funerals. Floral shops also include the other aspects of floristry, including marketing, buying and selling of flowers, production, etc.

=== Street vendors ===
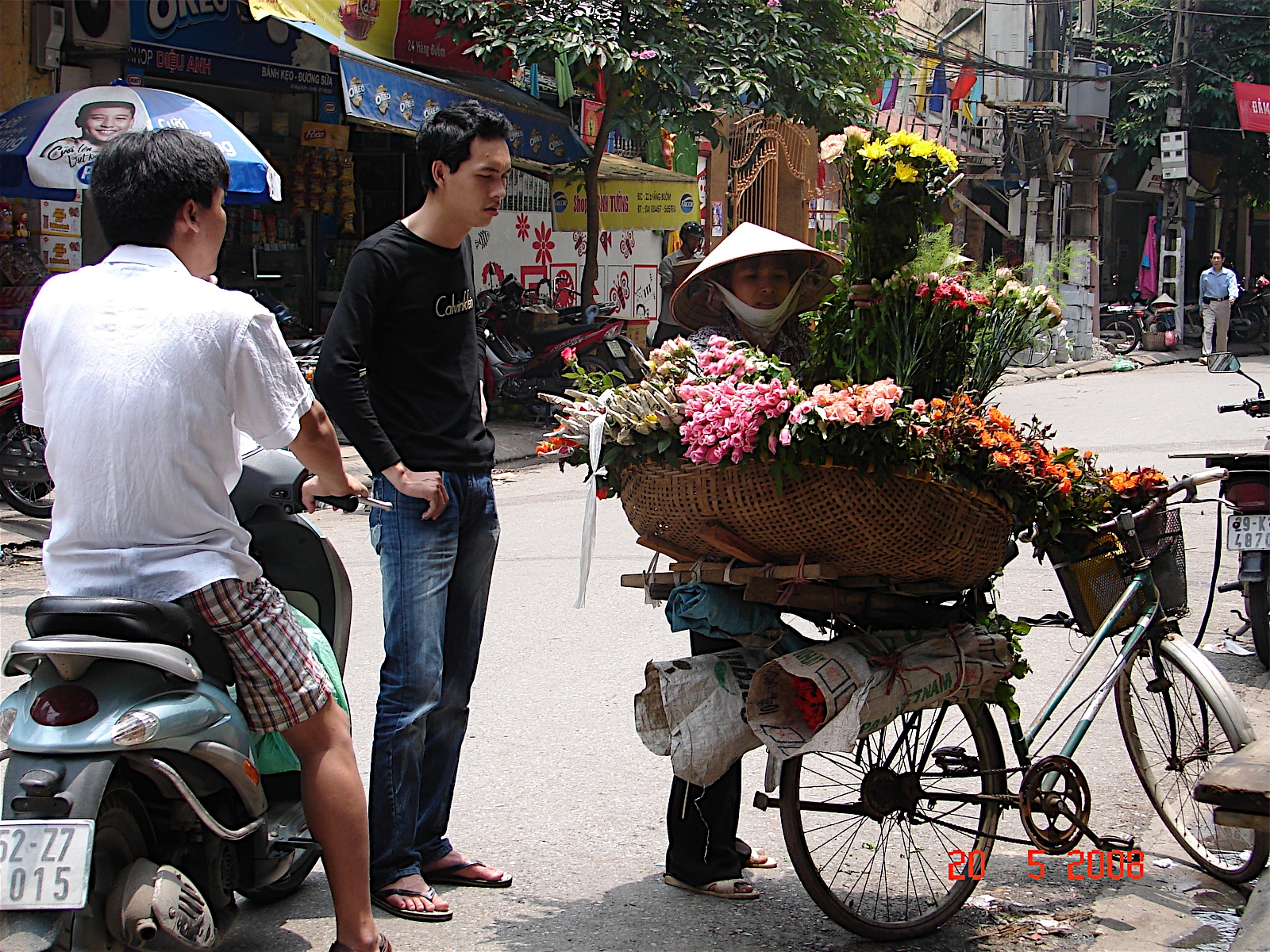
A street vendor selling flowers from a bicycle on a street in Hanoi, Vietnam

Street vendors that sell flowers and arrangements are called flower sellers. Flower sellers are popular in countries like Mexico, India, Vietnam and Southwestern states in the United States.

=== Associations ===
Prominent industry associations that promote floral design worldwide include the American Institute of Floral Designers (AIFD), the Society of American Florists (SAF), and the National Association of Flower Arranging Societies (NAFAS). In the United States, there are also numerous floriculture and floral design organizations for nearly all of the 50 states in the country. These associations promote floral design through workshops, conferences, flower shows, design competition opportunities and seminars.

=== Designers ===
Notable floral designers include Daniel Ost, Junichi Kakizaki, Paula Pryke, Phil Rulloda, Catherine Conlin, Constance Spry, Jennifer McGarigle, Judith Blacklock, Stanlee Gatti, Irene Hayes, Julia Clements, Azuma Makoto, and the White House Chief Floral Designer.

== See also ==
- Fashion design
- Floral Jamming
- Floral shop
- Floristry
- Flower seller
- History of flower arrangement
- Ikebana
- Interior design
- The Big Flower Fight
- Flower carpet
