= McGarigle =

McGarigle is a surname. Notable people with the surname include:

- Jennifer McGarigle (born 1970), American designer
- Tim McGarigle (born 1983), American football linebacker

== See also ==
- McGarrigle
