= James Blacklock =

James Blacklock may refer to:

- James Blacklock (cricketer, born 1883) (1883–1935), New Zealand cricketer
- James William Blacklock (1855–1907), his father, New Zealand cricketer
- Jimmy Blacklock (born 1980), American attorney and judge
