= Devon Savouries =

Defunct British bakery chain

- Industry: Bakery
- Founded: 1952
- Defunct: 2009
- Headquarters: Bath
- Number of locations: Multiple
- Owner: Timothy Anderson

Devon Savouries was a British bakery chain founded in 1952. Best known for its pies, sausage rolls, and curry pasties, it also produced Eccles cakes, apple turnovers, and flapjacks. The bakery's main factory was on Cheltenham Street in Bath. Over the years, it had popular shops across many locations across England including Bristol and Swindon.

The company was a supplier to JJ Beanos, a former coffee machine dispensing machine supplier which acquired Devon Savouries in July 2009.

== History ==
Swindon Central Library has a 1961 photograph of a Devon Savouries on Milford Street in Swindon.

In 1994, Devon Savouries had five shops in Bristol at The Haymarket, Queens Road, Penn Street, The Arcade, and Corn Street. As of 2013, one of the Bristol establishments was relocated to Lower Borough Walls.

As of November 2005, the chain had an establishment on Market Street in Swindon. As of July 2009, the chain had an establishment on Cheltenham Street in Bath.

In July 2009, the coffee and snacks vending machine company, JJ Beano's, acquired Devon Savouries. Around the same time, it was established that Devon Savouries had a turnover of £5 million per year and employed 20 staff.

In July 2020 and January 2022, the Swindon Advertiser paid homage to Devon Savouries. In July 2023, the Gazette and Herald paid tribute to Devon Savouries.
