= Phil Rulloda =

American floral designer (born 20th century)

- Occupations: Floral designer, teacher, author
- Known for: Floral design education, White House and Olympic design work
- Notable work: Contemporary and Tropical Floral Design (1990)

Phil Rulloda (born 20th century) is an American florist, floral-design teacher and writer.

He was a featured speaker and presenter in over 500 floral industry events worldwide. He put up Christmas decorations at the White House during the Gerald Ford administration and designed for the 1984 Summer Olympic Games.

Rulloda cowrote and published Contemporary and Tropical Floral Design with Silverio Casabar in 1990. He is the owner and head instructor of the Phil Rulloda Southern California School of Floral Design in Anaheim, California.

== Competitions ==
- Grand Champion and First Place Awards in Bridal Bouquet, Table Decor, Designer's Choice and State Category of the Florists' Transworld Delivery (FTD) America's Cup, 1974
- First Place in Theme Category and Impromptu Design, Interflora Europa/World Cup, 1976
- First Place in Table Decor and State Category, FTD Atlanta Invitational Competition, 1977

Rulloda owns and teaches at the Southern California School of Floral Design in Anaheim, California. . He and his family own and operate Avante Garden Florist there. In April 2010, the American Institute of Floral Designers Association granted him a lifetime membership for his years of service to it. He helped judge the Rose Parade float in 2017.

== Awards ==
- 1987 - First Inductee, Arizona Floriculture Hall of Fame
- 1991 - First Recipient, American Institute of Floral Designers Award of Design Influence
- 1200 - Recipient, Floral State Floral Association Place in the Sun Award
- 2003 - Recipient, Tennessee State Floral Association Hall of Fame Award
- 2004 - Recipient, Society of American Florists Tommy Bright Award
- 2007 - Recipient, American Institute of Floral Designers Award of Distinguished Service to the Floral Industry
