= Floral Jamming =

Floral design activity

Floral Jamming is a floral design activity originating from Hong Kong, where participants with little to no experience create floral arrangements using various plant materials. The floral designer provides all materials required for the floral display including flowers and foliage. Participants select the materials to create their own floral creation within a set time.

The activity originated in Hong Kong in 2011 by Lowdi Kwan, a floral designer with certification from the American Institute of Floral Designers in 1996.

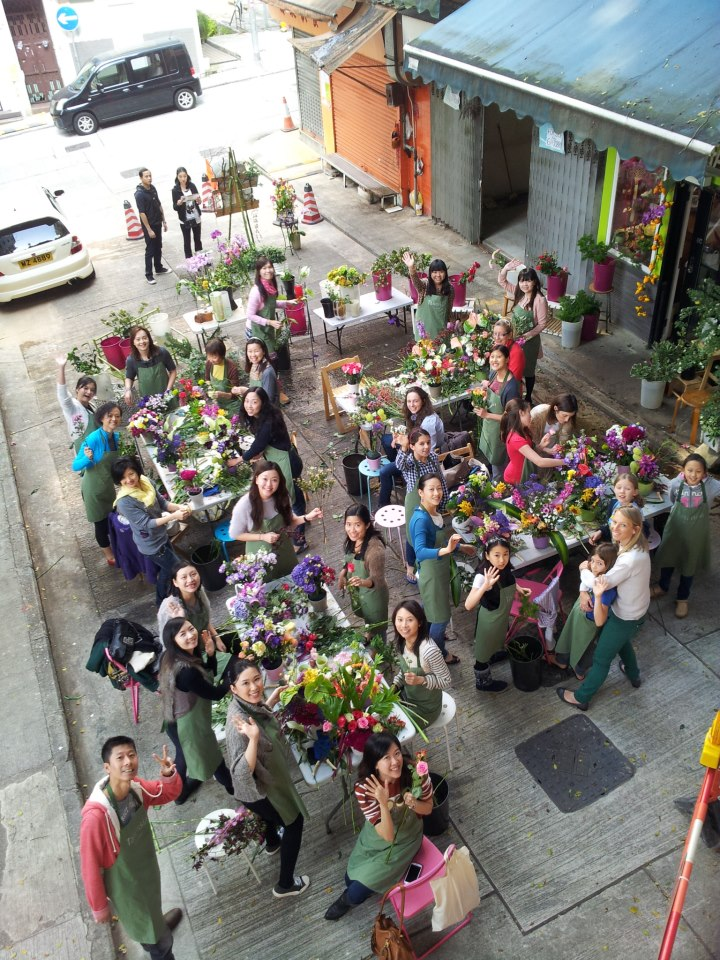
Floral Jamming at Tallensia Floral Art

== Overview ==
Kwan developed the concept after considering the reported therapeutic effects of horticulture.

Prior to a session, materials including the necessary tools and accessories would be displayed. To start off a session a floral designer will give a brief introduction on the materials and on how to start a floral arrangement by introducing the fundamental principles of floral arrangement. The participants then select flowers and other floral materials to construct their own floral arrangement. The floral designer will provide assistance and technical support throughout the session.
