= David Pennefather Thomas More =

David Pennefather Thomas More (1906–2001) was a writer, illustrator, painter, newspaper editor, and journalist. He was the writer and illustrator of 'Around Auckland' and 'The Golden Road to Cape Reinga'. He provided illustrations for 7 books written by E.M. Blaiklock (who used the pseudonym Grammaticus), and edited the book 'The Best of Grammaticus'.

While working as a reporter for the newspaper The Westminster Gazette he was often sent to locations as Lobby Lud where people were challenged to recognise him for a prize ("You are Lobby Lud and I claim my reward").

In 1939 David joined the Surrey Yeomanry Regiment. He was sent to France with the British Expeditionary Force and was evacuated at the Battle of Dunkirk. He was one of the 900 troops on board the Yewdale, a little tramp ship that normally carried a crew of 11. The Yewdale was badly damaged and limped back to England with many wounded. When they arrived along the coast of England they weren't sure where they were, but David recognised the coast of Ramsgate as he had been to boarding school there. The Yewdale finally anchored off Deal at 11 pm. At 6 am the next morning a lifeboat came out with a doctor and the wounded were taken off first. They landed finally on 31 May 1940 at 8 am. They were greeted by the Salvation Army with hot tea. David then served in the Middle East (Iraq) for the rest of the war running a paper called "Trunk Call".

After the war, he became editor of the "Devizes and Wiltshire Gazette" (now Gazette and Herald) from 1945 to 1949, and an editor of the Swindon Advertiser from 1949 to 1960. In 1960 he emigrated to New Zealand where he worked as editorial staff till 1990, reviewing books and providing illustrations and sketches for the New Zealand Herald. He was also a painter in oils and watercolors. His oil paintings include "Cornfield at Coate", "The Shortest Day at Wroughton", "Dahouët, côtes du nord", "Suilven, Wester Ross", "A modern nativity", "Ben Mor Coigagh, Wester Ross", and "Taranaki, Mount Egmont from Waiiti".

His most widely held book, according to WorldCat is Green shade, found in 188 WorldCat libraries. His books, Land of the three rivers : a centennial history of Piako County and The golden road to Cape Reinga, are each found in 39 WorldCat libraries

== Works ==
=== Oil Paintings ===
- Cornfield at Coate
- The Shortest Day at Wroughton
- Dahouët, côtes du nord
- Suilven, Wester Ross
- A modern nativity
- Ben Mor, Coigagh, Wester Ross
- Taranaki, Mount Egmont from Waiiti
- Whitfield, Auckland
- Sand Dunes at Hokianga
- View from 118 Victoria Avenue, Remuera, Auckland
- Garden at Port Fitzroy
- Early morning, Remuera, Auckland

=== Books ===
- Around Auckland (Author and Illustrator)
- The Golden Road to Cape Reinga. (Author and Illustrator)
- Hills of Home (Illustrator)
- Ten Pounds an acre (Illustrator)
- Green Shade (Illustrator)
- The Best of Grammaticus (Editor)
- Land of the three rivers: a centennial history of Piako County (Co-Author and Illustrator)
- Between the river and the hills, Waikato County 1876 - 1976 (Author and Illustrator)
- In The Sticks. (Illustrator).
- Along The Road (Illustrator)
- Walking Unseen (Author and Illustrator)
