= AIFD =

AIFD may refer to:

- American Institute of Floral Designers, American non-profit organization dedicated to recognizing and promoting the art of floral design as a professional career
- American Islamic Forum for Democracy, American Muslim think tank
