= British Florist Association =

- Abbreviation: BFA
- Formation: 1917; 109 years ago as the British Flower Marketing Association
- Type: Trade association
- Legal status: Non-profit company
- Purpose: Representation of florists to government and the public, floristry in the UK
- Location: United Kingdom
- Region served: United Kingdom
- Members: Representing all UK florists
- President: Brian Wills-Pope
- Affiliations: European Federation of Professional Florists Associations (Florint) and UK Floristry Judges Guild
- Website: britishfloristassociation.org

The British Florist Association (BFA) is the industry trade group that represents the British flower retail trade.

== History ==
The BFA was founded in 1917 as the British Flower Marketing Association. Its founding president was George Munro VMH. It became the BFA in 1948. In 1977 it took over the British Flower Industry Association.

In February 2010, the BFA took over the Society of Floristry, absorbing its membership and taking on the role as the standard-setting organisation for professional floristry in the UK. The BFA have a Training and Education committee of tutors, employers and industry professionals who liaise with relevant organisations to keep qualifications in Floristry relevant and to a high standard.

== Structure ==
The BFA represents UK florists its members enjoy benefits and a community of peers. Individually florists can join The Institute of Professional Florists which awards membership dependant on the level of qualification the florist holds. Corporate members (those businesses who supply the floral industry) support the association through membership as well. The organisation maintains a list of registered BFA business members on the website, who agree to uphold a code of conduct. These can be viewed by the consumer.

It is the UK member of Florint, the European Federation of Professional Florists Associations, which is based in Veenendaal, Utrecht in the Netherlands.

The BFA is involved with organising national competitions, and works closely with World Skills UK and the Royal Horticultural Society on presenting the profession to the public through it exhibitions and presentations.

== See also ==
- American Institute of Floral Designers
- British Flower Association, represents producers
