= Don Naughton =

New Zealand cricketer

Personal information
- Full name: Dominic Hugh Naughton
- Born: 11 September 1879; Nelson, New Zealand
- Died: 1960 (aged 80 or 81); Chatswood, Sydney, Australia
- Batting: Left-handed
- Relatives: Michael Naughton (brother)
- Source: Cricinfo, 27 October 2020

Dominic Hugh "Don" Naughton (11 September 1879 – 1960) was a New Zealand cricketer. He played in four first-class matches for Wellington between 1909 and 1911.

Naughton and his older brother Mick were prominent batsmen for the Petone club in Wellington for many years. Mick also represented Wellington.

== See also ==
- List of Wellington representative cricketers
