= Texas State Florists Association =

Texas State Florists' Association
- Industry: Floral industry
- Founded: 1914
- Headquarters: Leander, Texas, United States
- Services: Annual conventions, professional services, marketing, state legislation matters, the provision of educational opportunities
- Divisions: Texas Certified Florists Program, High School Knowledge Based, Level 1, and Level 2 Floral Certification
- Website: www.tsfa.org

The Texas State Florists' Association (TSFA) was founded in 1914 and is headquartered in Austin, Texas. Since its inception, the TSFA has grown into a professional trade association that covers many branches of the floral industry. Its membership base includes a diverse assortment of people in the floral industry, and it is involved in professional services and marketing in support of floral interests, state legislation, and the provision of educational opportunities. It represents the Texas floral industry, and has members in ten additional states. The organization hosts an annual convention, the first of which occurred in 1914. The TSFA sponsors the Texas Certified Florists Program, and publishes a monthly magazine named TEXAS in Bloom.

== Publications ==
The TSFA publishes a monthly magazine named TEXAS in Bloom, which covers topics concerning the floral industry and its purveyors. No issue is published in July, and during this month the organization's TSFA Yearbook is published.

== Events ==
In November 1914, the Texas State Florists' Association held a chrysanthemum and flower show at Houston, Texas.

=== Annual conventions ===
The Texas State Florists' Association's first annual convention occurred in 1914.

In 1915, the second annual convention occurred at Fort Worth, Texas on July 6-7.

No annual convention occurred in 1918 and 1919, due to "wartime conditions". In 1919, the TSFA sponsored the Texas-Southern Florists' Convention, which occurred on July 9–10 in Austin, Texas.

In 1920, the organization's annual convention occurred in Fort Worth, Texas on July 20-22.

In 1921, The annual convention occurred in San Antonio, Texas. The convention included a welcome to the delegates from O.B. Black, the mayor of San Antonio, an annual address by Otto Lang, the head of the Texas State Florists' Association, various seminars and programs relating to floristry, and an election for the next year's leaders for the association.

In 1922, the annual convention was held in Dallas, Texas on July 5-7. At the time, involved parties ran a one-third page welcome address for the event in the Dallas News.

In 1940, the annual convention occurred at Fort Worth, Texas on July 14-16.

The 1989 annual convention occurred in San Antonio, Texas on July 7–10.

At the 2001 annual convention, Norman Northen was recognized as the top floral designer in the state of Texas. Five finalists from various areas of Texas were chosen for the competition, and the event involved wedding, hospital and funeral floral arrangements, along with building a unique "...interpretive design display using props they have built themselves" and constructing a "'surprise' arrangement on the spot".

In 2014, the annual convention occurred in Austin, Texas. Sheri Jentsch placed as first place in the organization's Texas Cup competition. Twenty floral designers competed in the event.

=== State Fair of Texas ===
In October 2013, the TSFA and TexasLocalFlorist.com (a subsidiary of TSFA) sponsored the first annual Junior Floral Cup Design Championship at the State Fair of Texas. The competition had five high school student finalists that had completed Level 1 High School Floral Design Certification and had "qualified based on winning performances at the TSFA Jr. Cup Preliminary Competition in their hometowns".

== Membership ==
Members in the organization include growers, wholesalers, floral product and supply manufacturers, interior plantscapers, brokers, shippers, importers, and others in the floral industry. A number of members are university professors, students, botanical researchers and retired florists.

In 1971, the TSFA had 1,570 members.

== Texas Certified Florists Program and Exams ==
The Texas State Florists’ Association sponsors the Texas Certified Florists Program. Only those who pass the qualifying exam are allowed to pursue this goal. In completing the 12-course requirement and passing the rigorous final examination, a florist is designated a Texas Master Florist. The 12 courses required of each participant include 9 online courses, and 3 hands-on courses. The online courses include: principles of design, the care and handling of foliage, flowering plants and cut flowers, customer relations, floral delivery, merchandising, advertising and promotion, and business procedures. Online education is then supplemented with hands-on learning, and all participants in the certification program must attend the following three hands-on courses. The significance of sympathy flowers and floral design is the subject of "Sympathy Design Styles and Techniques". Another socially-prominent ritual, the wedding, is a focus. Another hands-on course, "Current Design Styles and Techniques", allows florists to construct several of the most noteworthy styles of floral presentation flower arrangement: vase arrangements, vegetative, formalinear and parallel designs.

Education is a major part of TSFA's work, and they also provide learning opportunities to those outside the floral industry. In 2004, the association developed the Texas High School Certification Program, which "allows school districts to provide more value to their diploma" and helps to provide young floral designers to accommodate the needs of retail florist. Requirements for the certification are enrollment and completion of the year long Texas Education Agency approved floral design curriculum and passing a Texas State Florists’ Association approved written exam and the design of two floral pieces in a timed setting. The students who complete the program are prepared for an entry-level position in a retail flower shop.

=== High School Level 1 Floral Certification ===
TSFA has also been involved in "...training high school agriculture teachers with the intention of their students testing to become High School Floral Design Certified". This program serves to prepare students for careers in floriculture and to "increase sales of Texas floriculture products". The program emphasizes knowledge of the floral industry, industry terminology and the identification of foliage and plants. The certification is awarded by TSFA after students "...demonstrate proficiency on written and performance tests".

== Partnerships ==
In 2012, The TSFA has partnered with the Texas Department of Agriculture, creating a high school floral design competition to "increase awareness of local Texas florists" and to "increase promotion and sales of local flower shops through increased media coverage". This was enabled in part from various federal grants for several projects that totaled $1.8 million, which were awarded to improve the production of "fruits, vegetables", and "other specialty crops" in Texas.

TSFA is a member organization of the Texas Employers for Immigration Reform, an organization that seeks to reform immigration laws in the United States.

== Similar organizations ==
The West Texas New Mexico Florist Association has an annual convention that includes floral design competitions.

== See also ==
- Horticulture
