= James Blacklock (cricketer, born 1883) =

New Zealand cricketer

Personal information
- Full name: James Pearson Blacklock
- Born: 17 February 1883; Wellington, New Zealand
- Died: 22 January 1935 (aged 51); Westport, West Coast, New Zealand
- Batting: Right-handed
- Relatives: James Blacklock (father); Bob Blacklock (uncle); Arthur Blacklock (uncle)

Domestic team information
- Years: Team
- 1904/05–1913/14: Wellington

Career statistics
Competition	First-class
Matches	20
Runs scored	864
Batting average	22.73
100s/50s	1/6
Top score	124
Catches/stumpings	11/–
- Source: Cricinfo, 10 April 2023

James Pearson Blacklock (17 February 1883 – 22 January 1935) was a New Zealand cricketer who played first-class cricket for Wellington from 1904 to 1914. He also played two matches for New Zealand in the years before New Zealand played Test cricket.

Blacklock was born in Wellington. He appeared in 20 first-class matches as a right-handed batsman. He scored 864 runs, with one century: 124 against Hawke's Bay in 1908–09, when he batted for only 85 minutes, hit five sixes, and added 196 runs for the second wicket with Don Naughton. He played for New Zealand in their two matches against Australia in 1904–05, top-scoring with 30 in New Zealand's second innings in the second match.

Blacklock's father, James Blacklock, played for Wellington from 1878 to 1883, and two of his uncles also played first-class cricket for Wellington.

Blacklock fought in the Boer War at the age of 17. He later worked as an accountant and secretary in the tanning firm of Hirst and Co. of Wellington.
