= Leather-leaf fern =

Leather-leaf fern is a common name for several ferns and may refer to:

- Polypodium scouleri, native to western North America
- Pyrrosia eleagnifolia, native to New Zealand
- Rumohra adiantiformis, widespread
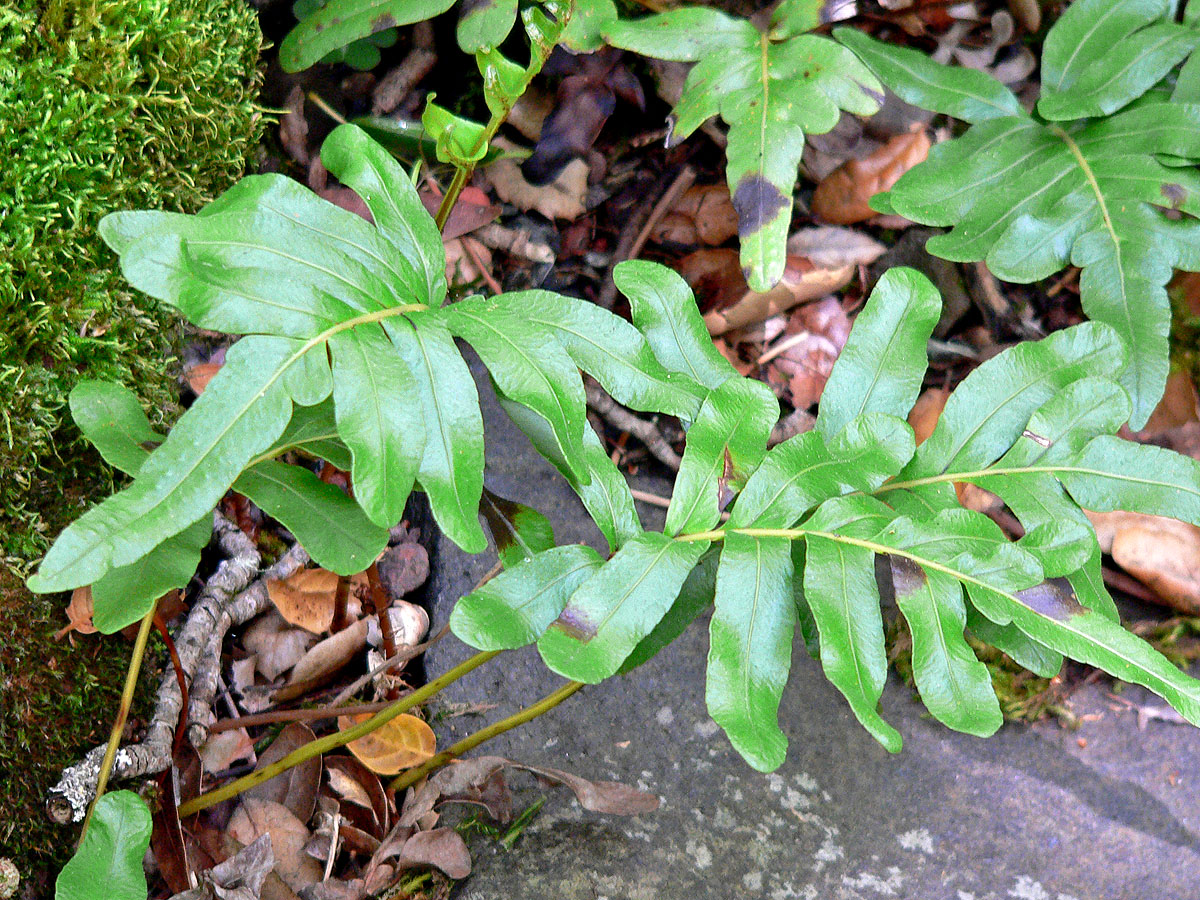
Polypodium scouleri

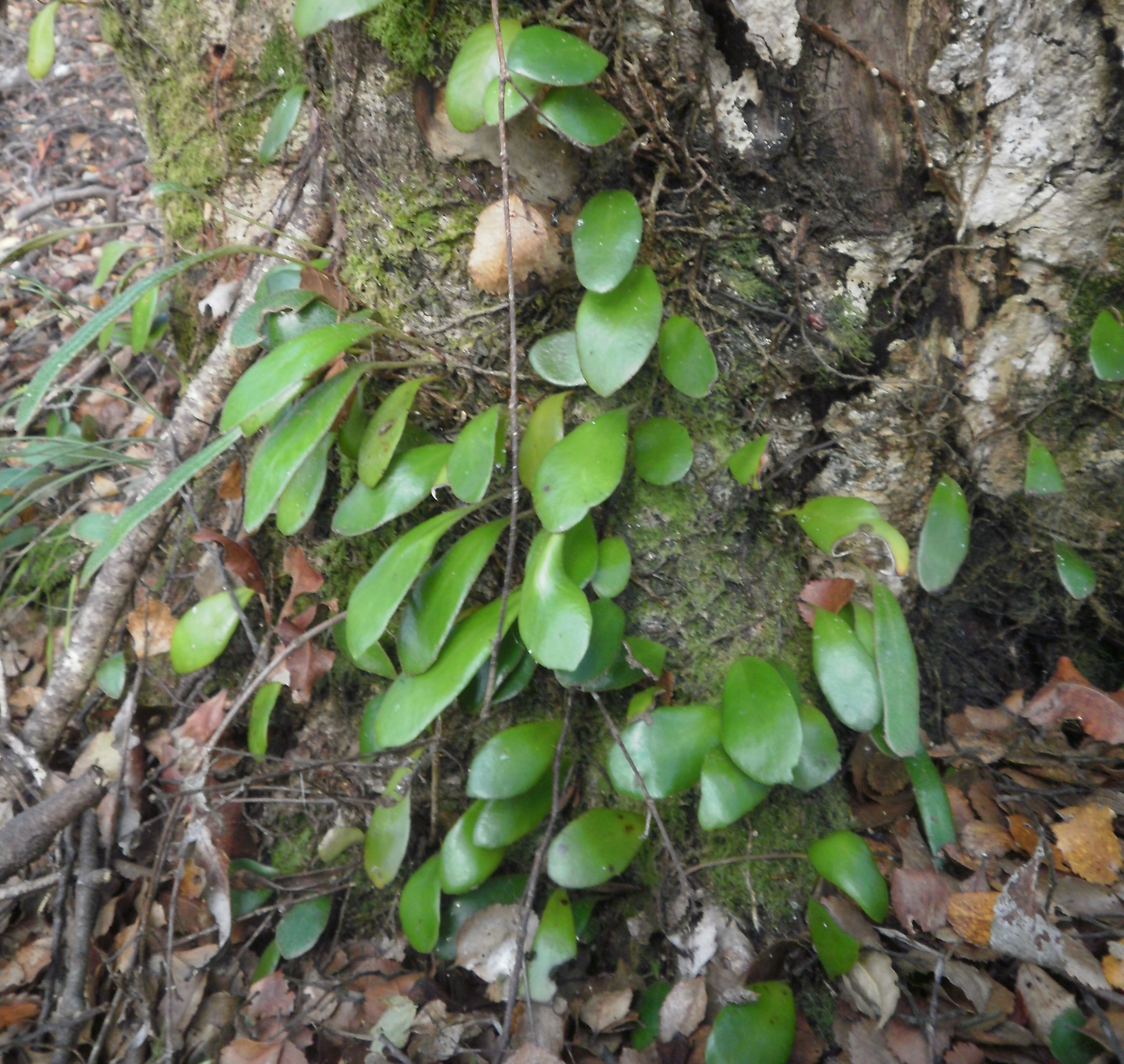
Pyrrosia eleagnifolia

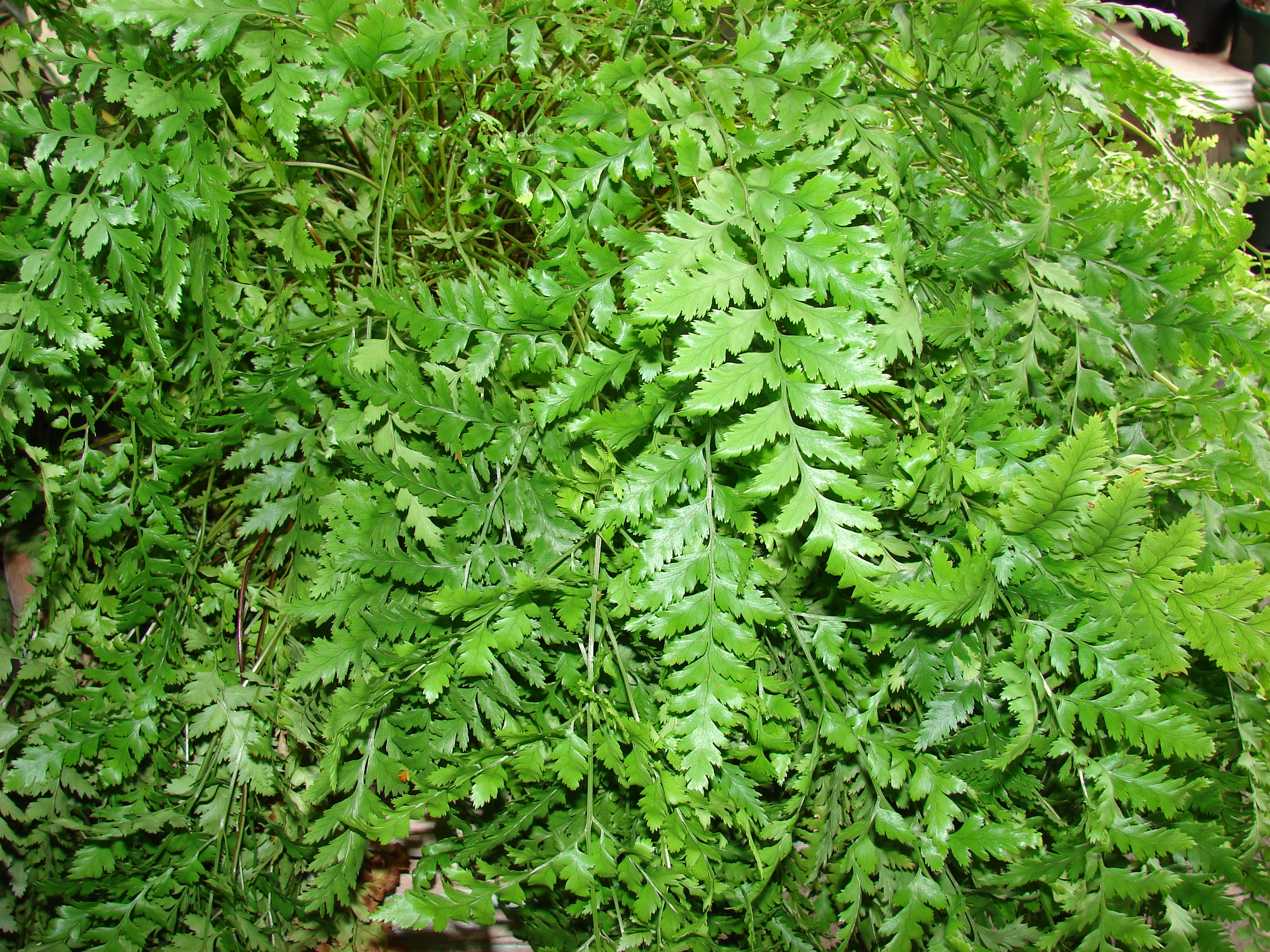
Rumohra adiantiformis
