= Swindon Advertiser =

Daily newspaper in Swindon, England

- Swindon Advertiser cover on 20 February 2007
- Type: Daily newspaper
- Format: Tabloid
- Owner: USA Today Co.
- Publisher: Newsquest
- Founded: 1854
- Headquarters: Dorcan, Swindon, Wiltshire, England
- Circulation: 3,429 (as of 2024)
- Website: swindonadvertiser.co.uk

The Swindon Advertiser is a daily tabloid newspaper, published in Swindon. The newspaper was founded in 1854, and had an audited average daily circulation at the end of 2017 of 8,828.

It claims to have been the UK's first provincial 'penny-paper'.

It is owned by Newsquest, the UK subsidiary of U.S.-based Gannett Company.

It is the original of the four newspapers that had their headquarters in the Newsquest Wiltshire building in Victoria Road, Swindon, the others being three weeklies:

- Gazette and Herald
- Swindon Star
- Wiltshire Times

== History ==
The Swindon Advertiser was founded in 1854 by William Morris (Great Grandfather of Desmond Morris). Originally intended to be a weekly paper, His aim was to produce a newspaper "that would act as a mouthpiece for the poor." Morris decided to print one issue a month due to the Stamp Tax laws at the time only applying to newspapers published every 28 days.

It was originally printed as a broadsheet on 6 February 1854 and titled the "Swindon Advertiser and Monthly Record" using a hand press in his father's shop in Wood Street. Morris was sole writer, editor, printer and also delivered it personally, selling each copy for a penny. Using the inclusion of advertisements from local businesses, the second edition doubled in size.

Other newspaper companies were influenced by Morris' example of a penny priced paper and quickly produced their own in the region and ultimately throughout the country, resulting in the government amending the stamp tax laws to a more favourable version. The paper became published weekly due to this change. In 1855 Morris could afford to move the publication to new premises in Victoria Road where it remained until 2018. Morris funded the building of Newspaper House and added a printing shop to the rear.

Morris became infamous in some circles for his scathing and often vitriolic editorials, with one editorial about an incident at Coate Water in 1861 leading to effigies of him and copies of his paper being burned in the town.

The whole proceedings were so strongly condemned by the editor and proprietor of the "Swindon Advertiser" that he roused the irony of a section of Conservatives in the town and district to such an extent that men were employed to scour the district and collect all the "Advertisers" they possibly could. This having been done, a bon-fire was made in the Market Square, in which all these copies, also an effigy of the Editor himself, were committed to the flames.

— Frederick Large,

In the same year, the paper was printed using steam power for the first time. Using a boiler and engine built in the Swindon Works of the Great Western Railway, they produced 5,000 copies a week.

In 1870, it was renamed the "Swindon Advertiser and Wiltshire, Berkshire and Gloucestershire Chronicle". William Morris died at the age of 65 in 1891 and the paper passed into the hands of his three sons, William, Samuel and Frank.

Daily publishing began in 1898, with it being renamed the "Evening Advertiser" in 1926.

The company also acquired the "North Wiltshire Herald" in 1922, now titled the "Gazette and Herald".

Due to paper shortages, the paper became a tabloid during the 1940s, switching back to the broadsheet format after the war. With the advances in technology, the paper moved to desktop publishing methods in the 1980s and then on 6 September 1995 changed back to being published as a tabloid. In the late 70's it won numerous awards for marketing campaigns, including the "Adver Bug" and at one point reached a daily audited circulation of just over 40,000

In July 2005, the paper changed its name back to the "Swindon Advertiser" and announced its intention to publish two editions a day, with this change came a price rise from 32p to 35p. In 2006 the two editions per day were dropped and only one daily edition was printed, the price remained at 35p. The paper went to print at 04.00am each morning and was generally on the shelves by 07.00am, distributed by a fleet of transit vans across Wiltshire.

In November 2008 the paper's cover price was increased from 35p to 38p. It currently stands at 65p after being pushed up in price late 2010 to 42p and again in 2013.

Due to a petition raised and successfully imposed by Mathew Purvis (a local Swindon resident) the price will remain fixed at 65p for at least until 2016. This was raised on the basis that the key demographic for the paper was populated by those suffering from a dip in the economy, and was designed to create and raise a community morale.

In 2018 the newspaper moved from its historic offices at Newspaper House on Victoria Road to the Edison Office Park in Dorcan.

== Editors ==
- William Morris (1854–1891)
- David Pennefather Thomas More (1949–1960)
- Simon O'Neill
- Mark Waldron
- Dave King (2007–2011)
- Daniel Chipperfield (2022–present)
