= Daniel Ost =

Floral artist

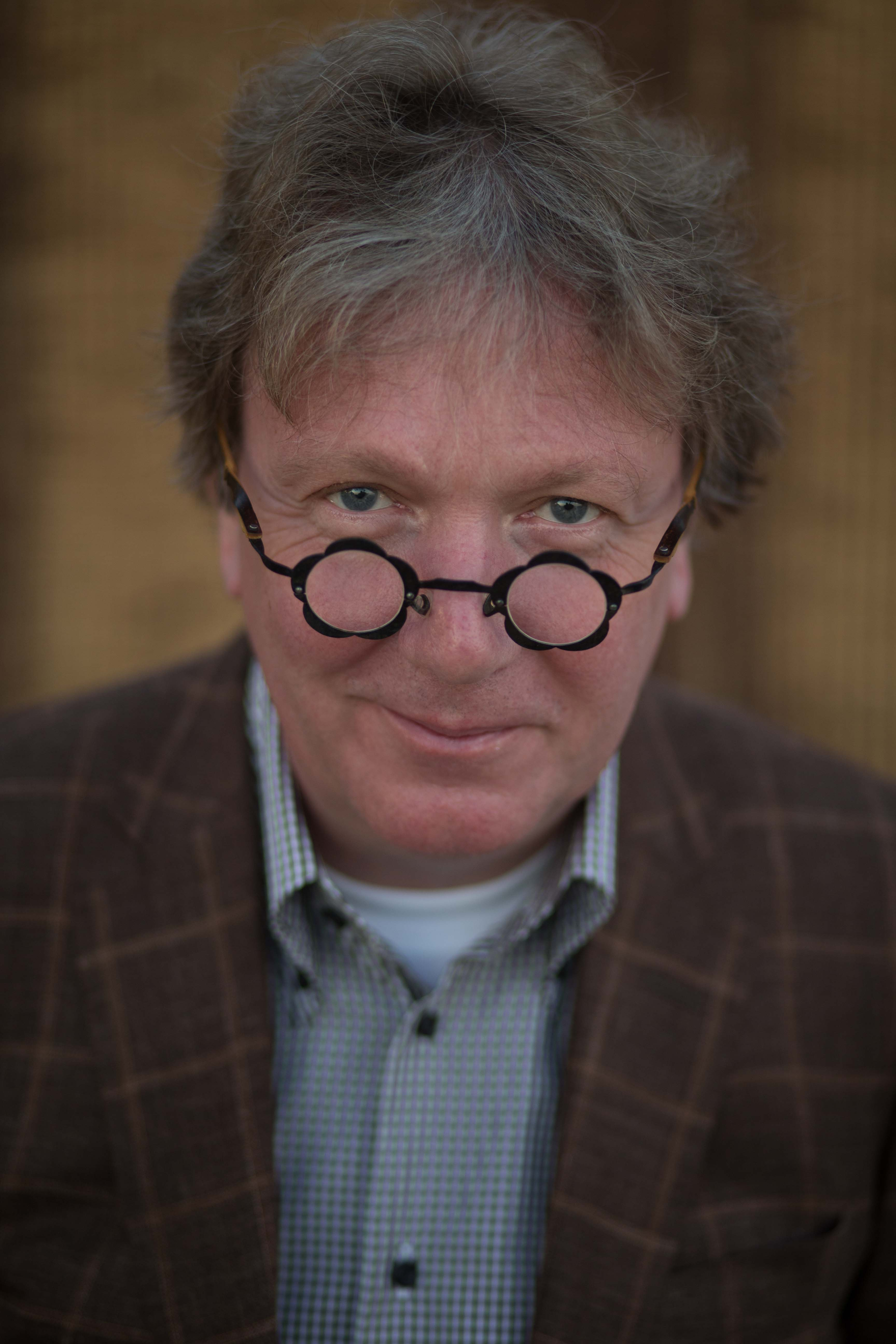
- The Belgian flower artist and garden architect
- Born: 8 May 1955 (age 71); Sint-Niklaas, Belgium
- Occupations: Floral artist, Floral designer, Garden architect
- Spouse: Marie-Anne Boeykens
- Children: Maarten Ost, Nele Ost

Daniel Ost (born 5 August 1955) is a Belgian floral artist, floral designer and garden architect. CBS News has described him as "the world's leading flower designer" while The New York Times says that "to call him a master flower designer is akin to calling Annie Leibovitz a shutterbug".

His clientele includes numerous royal families, sheikhs, multinational organisations and humanitarian organisations like UNICEF.

== Biography ==
Ost was born in 1955 in the suburban town of Sint-Niklaas, Belgium, the eldest of six children.

=== Marriage and children ===
Ost and his wife Marie-Anne have two children. Maarten Ost became a children's book author living in Leuven, Belgium; he died in 2017. Their daughter, Nele Ost, is following in Ost's footsteps as a floral designer and is the creative director of the company.

=== Education ===
- Sociology at Bisschoppelijke Normaalschool in Sint-Niklaas, Belgium, from 1967 to 1973
- Flower design at IMOV Institute in Afsnee, Belgium, from 1973 to 1976
- Master of Floral Art at Tuinbouwschool Vught, The Netherlands, from 1976 to 1979
- Instructor floral art in Japan and Taiwan
- Founder of Daniël Ost Flower Academy in Sint-Niklaas and Tokyo, Japan

=== Business ===
Ost and Marie-Anne Boeykens founded Floreal, a flower shop in Sint-Niklaas, Belgium, in 1979. The business later evolved into the Daniel Ost Group, an international floral design house active in retail floristry, event decoration, and garden and landscape design.

The Daniel Ost Group operates several retail locations in Belgium and the Middle East, including shops in Brussels, Knokke and Riyadh, and undertakes floral and landscape projects worldwide.

The company is led by Yann Callaert, who is Chief Executive Officer, and his daughter Nele Ost, who is Creative Director. Ost is no longer involved as an owner or in the daily management of the business and only acts in an advisory capacity on limited selected projects.

== Published works ==
Throughout his career, Ost has published numerous books about his exhibitions, decorations and gardens. He has also been featured in numerous magazines like Elle, Vogue, Architectural Digest and Bloomberg, regarding floral design and garden architecture.

- Leafing Through Flowers I (1989)
- Leafing Through Flowers II (1993)
- Leafing Through Flowers III (1997)
- Ostentatief (1998)
- Invitations (2002)
- Remaining Flowers (2003)
- East x West (2005)
- Transparant (2007)
- Invitations II (2009)
- Daniël Ost - The Master (2015)

== Awards ==
- 1st place Belgian Championship in Brussels in 1979
- 1st place Belgian Championship in Brussels in 1983
- 1st place Golden Orchid in Hannover in 1981
- 1st place Golden Orchid in Hannover in 1983
- 2nd place European Championship in Brussels in 1983
- 2nd place World Championship in Detroit in 1985
- 1st place Osaka World Expo in Osaka in 1990
- Citizen of Honour of Sint-Niklaas since 2005
- Top 7 European Garden Designers in Germany in 2014

== Honours ==
- 2015: Imperial Order of the Rising Sun.
- Citizen of Honour of Kurashiki (Japan) since 2015
