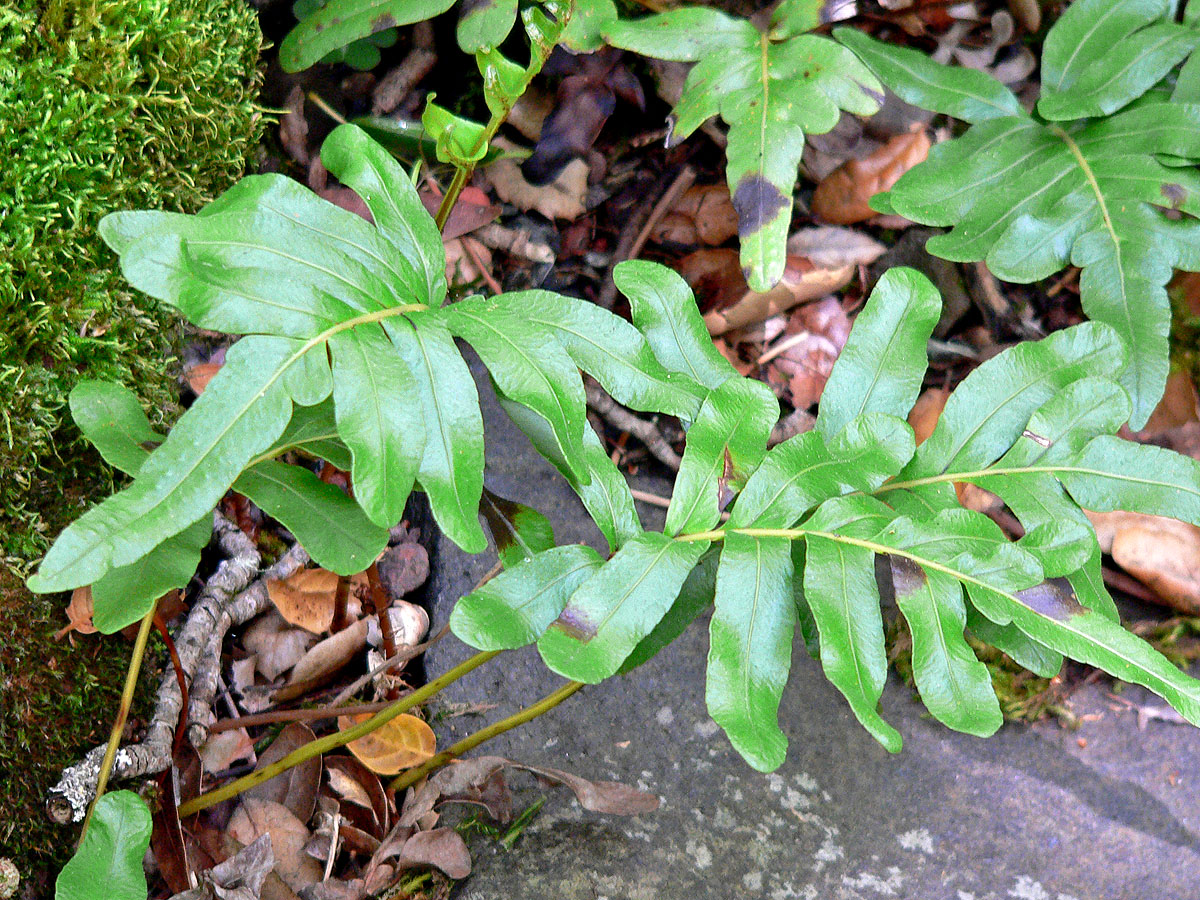

Conservation status
- Secure (NatureServe)

Scientific classification
- Kingdom: Plantae
- Clade: Tracheophytes
- Division: Polypodiophyta
- Class: Polypodiopsida
- Order: Polypodiales
- Suborder: Polypodiineae
- Family: Polypodiaceae
- Genus: Polypodium
- Species: P. scouleri

Binomial name
- Polypodium scouleri Hook. & Grev.

Synonyms
- Goniophlebium scouleri (Hook. & Grev.) J.Sm.

= Polypodium scouleri =

Species of ferns

Polypodium scouleri is a species of fern known by the common names leathery polypody, Scouler's polypody, coast polypody and leather-leaf fern. It is native to coastal western North America from British Columbia to Guadalupe Island off Baja California. It is a plant of the coastline, growing in cracks on coastal bluffs, in oceanside forests, beach dunes, and similar habitat. It is often affected by heavy fogs and sea spray. This polypody anchors with a waxy, scaly rhizome. It produces triangular or oblong leaves up to 85 centimeters (33 in) in maximum length and 8 cm (3.1 in) width. Each leaf is made up of many round-tipped linear or oblong segments which are usually stiff and leathery in texture and edged with shallow, rounded teeth. The underside of each leaf segment is crowded with rounded sori each up to half a centimeter wide. The sori contain the spores.
