= Michael Naughton =

New Zealand cricketer

Personal information
- Born: 1873
- Died: 18 August 1959 (aged 85–86); Hutt Valley, New Zealand
- Source: Cricinfo, 27 October 2020

Michael Naughton (1873 – 18 August 1959) was a New Zealand cricketer. He played in one first-class match for Wellington in 1897/98.

== See also ==
- List of Wellington representative cricketers
