= Bob Blacklock =

New Zealand cricketer

Personal information
- Full name: Robert Valder Blacklock
- Born: 1 April 1865; Melbourne, Australia
- Died: 6 October 1897 (aged 32); Wellington, New Zealand
- Batting: Right-handed
- Relatives: Arthur Blacklock (brother); James Blacklock (nephew)

Domestic team information
- Years: Team
- 1883/84–1895/96: Wellington

Career statistics
Competition	First-class
Matches	31
Runs scored	771
Batting average	14.82
100s/50s	0/6
Top score	84*
Catches/stumpings	11/–
- Source: Cricinfo, 20 March 2018

Robert Valder Blacklock (1 April 1865 – 6 October 1897) was a cricketer who played first-class cricket for Wellington in New Zealand from 1884 to 1896.

Bob Blacklock was a solid batsman, "very hard to dispose of". He made his highest score of 84 not out for Wellington against Canterbury in 1883–84, his first season, just days after his nineteenth birthday. Wellington trailed by 114 on the first innings and were 62 for 5 at one stage in their second before Blacklock made the highest score of the match and ensured a draw.

According to Blacklock's obituarist in the New Zealand Times, "It seemed to be that it was only when his side was in real trouble that he was seen at his best." He scored two fifties, top-scoring for Wellington in each innings, to defy Auckland and secure a draw in 1884–85. He also top-scored in Wellington's match against New South Wales in 1893–94, scoring 65 and adding 117 for the third wicket (out of an eventual team total of 180) with Alfred Holdship.

He captained Wellington several times in the 1890s, and was a member of New Zealand's first victorious side when they beat New South Wales in 1895–96.

Blacklock worked for the Government Insurance Department in Wellington. He had been ill for some time before his early death, and had had to miss the 1896–97 season for that reason.

He also played rugby union for Wellington.
