= Blakelock =

Blakelock may refer to:

== People ==
=== Given name ===
- Ernest Blakelock Thubron (1861–1927), French Olympic motorboat racer

=== Surname ===
- Denys Blakelock (1901–1970), British actor
- James Blakelock (1903–1955), New Zealand doctor
- Keith Blakelock, (1945–1985), a British police constable who was killed by a mob during the Broadwater Farm riot.
- Ralph Blakelock (priest) (1803–1892), English archdeacon of Norfolk
- Ralph Albert Blakelock (1847–1919), an American romanticist painter.
- Ralph Anthony Blakelock (1915–1963), a British botanist.
- Robin Blakelock (born 1944), or Robin Lloyd, British former tennis player
- Thomas Aston Blakelock (1883–1974), an English-Canadian merchant and politician.

== Places ==
- T.A. Blakelock High School in Oakville, Ontario, named after Thomas Aston Blakelock.

== See also ==
- Blaiklock (disambiguation)
- Blacklock (disambiguation)
