= Judith Blacklock =

British writer

Judith Blacklock is an author and owner and founder of the Judith Blacklock Flower School.

In 2011, she organised Flowers@Chicheley Hall. She teaches and demonstrates at leading global floral events, including the Chelsea Flower Show. and the National Garden Clubs of America. She has travelled and taught in Bahrain, Canada, China, Dubai, Turkey, USA, Japan, Spain and Kuwait.

Blacklock was editor of National Association of Flower Arranging Societies The Flower Arranger from 2003 - 2016.

The Judith Blacklock Flower School is located in Knightsbridge. It is accredited by the British Accreditation Council and the specialised courses are accredited by the American Institute of Floral Designers.

In June 2006, a rose was named "Judith Blacklock" in her honour with the proceeds going to Alzheimer's Society.

== Books ==
- Teach Yourself Flower Arranging (1992)
- Teach Yourself Dried Flowers (1993)
- Silk Flowers (1996)
- Bloomsbury International Encyclopedia of Flower Arranging (1997)
- The Judith Blacklock Encyclopedia of Flower Design (2006)
- Judith Blacklock's Flower Recipes for Winter (2007)
- Judith Blacklock's Flower Recipes for Spring (2007)
- Judith Blacklock's Flower Recipes for Summer (2008)
- Judith Blacklock's Flower Recipes for Autumn (2008)
- Judith Blacklock's Seasonal Flower Recipes (2009)
- Church Flowers (2009)
- Floristry: A Step-By-Step Guide (2010)
- Flower Arranging: The Complete Guide for Beginners (2012)
- Contemporary Floral Design (2015)
- Buying and Arranging Cut Flowers: The essential A-Z guide (2016)
- Arranging Flowers in a Vase (2017)

== Selected television appearances ==
- Kirstie’s Homemade Home
- The One Show
- Made in Chelsea
- Lorraine
