= Bill Blacklock =

Australian rules footballer

Personal information
- Full name: William Arthur Blacklock
- Born: 17 July 1883; Fitzroy, Victoria
- Died: 8 July 1942 (aged 58); Heidelberg, Victoria
- Original team: Ivanhoe

Playing career^{1}
Years	Club	Games (Goals)
1907	Fitzroy	6 (1)
- ^{1} Playing statistics correct to the end of 1907.

William Arthur Blacklock (17 July 1883 – 8 July 1942) was an Australian rules footballer who played with Fitzroy in the Victorian Football League (VFL).
