= Wiltshire Times =

Regional newspaper in England

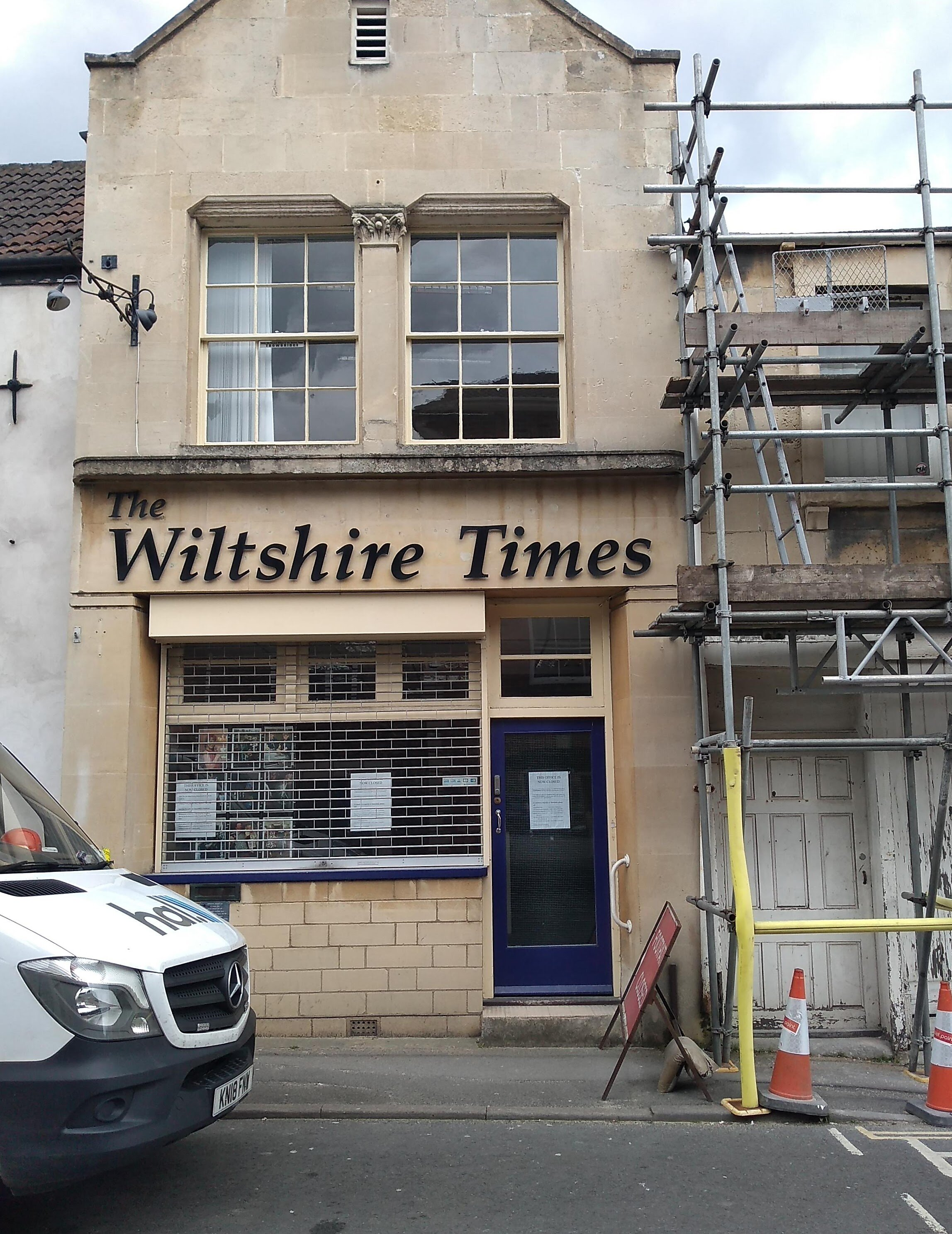
- Former Wiltshire Times office in Duke Street, Trowbridge
- Type: Weekly newspaper
- Format: Tabloid
- Owner(s): Newsquest Media Group
- Editor: Daniel Chipperfield
- Headquarters: North Bradley
- Circulation: 2,740 (as of 2023)
- Website: www.wiltshiretimes.co.uk

The Wiltshire Times is a weekly newspaper published in Trowbridge, Wiltshire in South West England. The paper serves the western Wiltshire towns of Bradford on Avon, Trowbridge, Corsham, Chippenham, Warminster, Westbury and Melksham, and their surrounding rural areas.

== History ==
The newspaper was in existence by 1881 as the Wiltshire Times and Trowbridge Advertiser. In 1900, the West Wiltshire Printing Company bought the printing business of William Michael in Westbury for printing The West Wilts Post, which was soon taken over by the Wiltshire Times. For more than a hundred years, the newspaper was based at 15, Duke Street, in the Trowbridge town centre, which had been home to a newspaper office since about 1850. In 2019, it moved to North Bradley, stating that its building was no longer fit for purpose.

== Present day ==
The paper covers news in all parts of Wiltshire, concentrating on events within its west Wiltshire coverage area.

The Wiltshire Times and its sister paper the Wiltshire Gazette & Herald now share offices at the White Horse Business Park in North Bradley, on the outskirts of Trowbridge.

The Wiltshire Times often has special "campaigns" that appear in the newspaper, such as a campaign to reduce the number of potholes in Wiltshire and a campaign to save jobs at a Bowyers factory in Trowbridge. The factory closed for good in 2007.
