= McGarrigle =

McGarrigle is a surname. Notable people with the surname include:

- Anna McGarrigle (born 1944), Canadian folk singer-songwriter
- Jane McGarrigle (1941–2025), Canadian songwriter and musician
- Kate McGarrigle (1946–2010), Canadian folk singer-songwriter
- Thomas J. McGarrigle, American politician
