= Arthur Blacklock =

New Zealand cricketer

Personal information
- Born: 1868; South Yarra, Melbourne, Australia
- Died: 20 October 1934 (aged 66); Wellington, New Zealand
- Relatives: Bob Blacklock (brother); James Blacklock (nephew)

Domestic team information
- Years: Team
- 1884/85–1895/96: Wellington

Career statistics
Competition	First-class
Matches	15
Runs scored	569
Batting average	21.88
100s/50s	0/3
Top score	69
Catches/stumpings	8/–
- Source: Cricinfo, 8 March 2018

Arthur Blacklock (1868 – 20 October 1934) was a cricketer who played first-class cricket for Wellington in New Zealand from 1885 to 1895.

Arthur Blacklock was a solid batsman, "very hard to dispose of". He played his first first-class match when he was 16 or 17, top-scoring with 22 in Wellington's first innings against Nelson in 1884–85. He made his highest score of 69, also the highest score in the match, for Wellington when they defeated Nelson by an innings and 190 runs in 1888–89.

In 1894-95 he scored 222 runs in three first-class matches at an average of 37.00, putting him second in the season's national aggregates. His 45, opening the batting in Wellington's second innings of 98, was particularly valuable in Wellington's 45-run victory over Otago. However, he played only one more match of first-class cricket after that season.

Blacklock worked for a number of retail and manufacturing firms, and was joint manager of Ross and Glendining at the time of his retirement two years before his death in 1934 at the age of 66. He and his wife had two daughters.
