= Ken Blaiklock =

British Antarctic surveyor (1927–2020)

Ken Blaiklock OBE
- Born: Kenneth Victor Blaiklock; 6 December 1927
- Died: 20 September 2020 (aged 92)
- Children: 1, Catherine

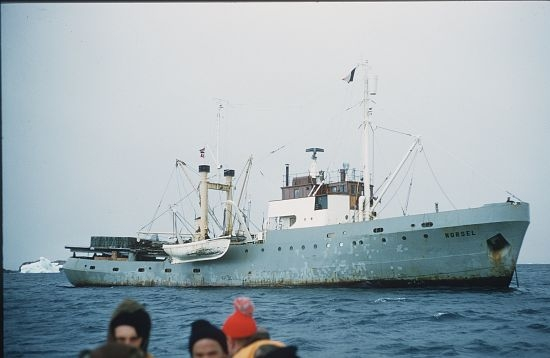
Blaiklock served as a surveyor on the Norwegian ship MV Norsel in 1955.

Kenneth Victor Blaiklock OBE (6 December 1927 – 20 September 2020) was a British Antarctic surveyor who took part in Sir Vivian Fuchs's Commonwealth Trans-Antarctic Expedition that completed the first overland crossing of Antarctica. During this expedition, he reached the South Pole by dog sled for the first time since Amundsen. He was awarded the Polar Medal with three bars.

== Personal ==
Kenneth Victor Blaiklock was born in December 1927.

== Career ==
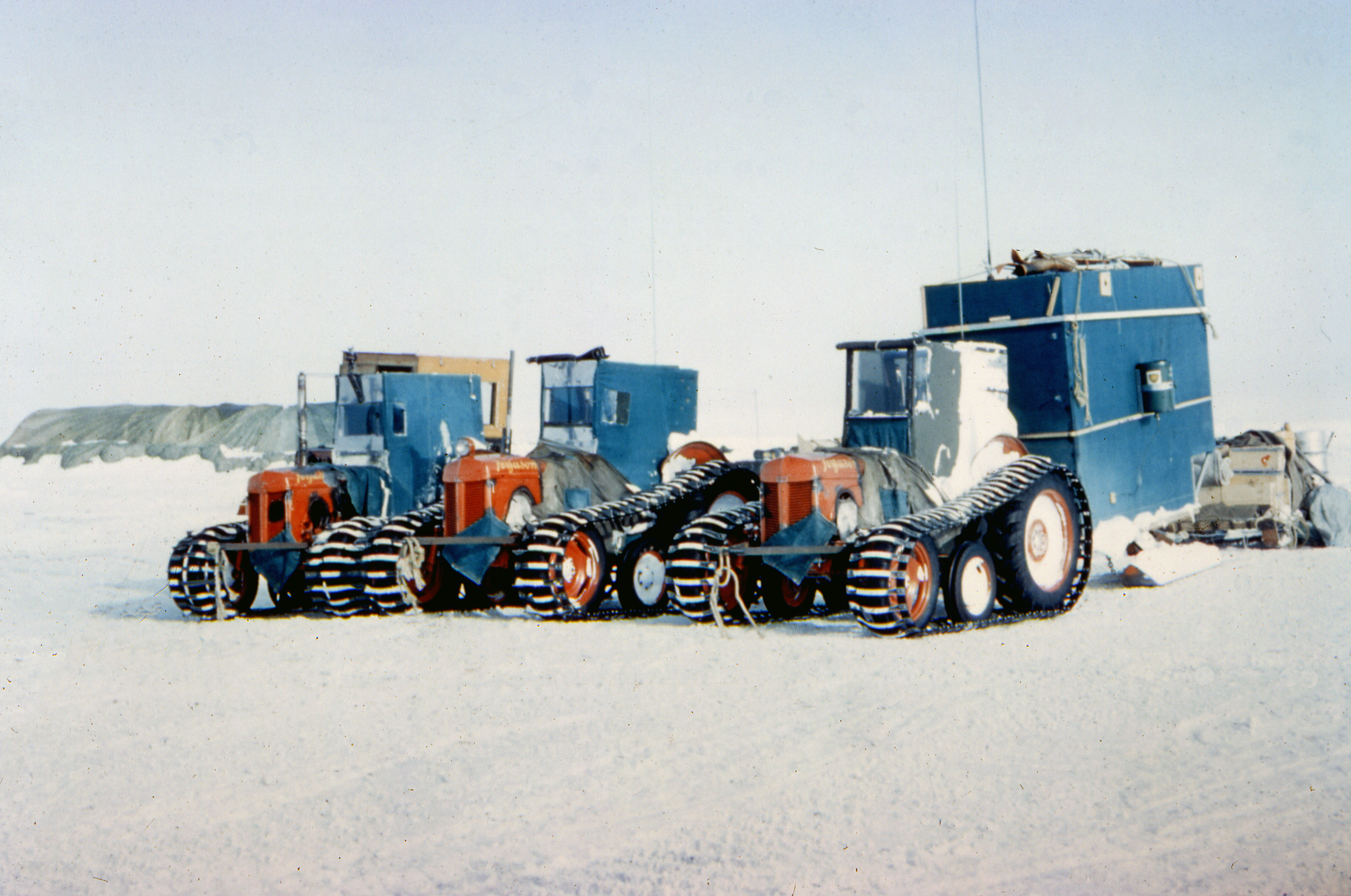
Tractors used in the Commonwealth Trans-Antarctic Expedition.

Blaiklock's Antarctic career began in 1947 at Stonington Island under Sir Vivian Fuchs. From 1952 to 1954 he was employed as a surveyor at Base D, Hope Bay, in the Falkland Islands Dependencies. In 1955 he served on the MV Norsel as a surveyor and helping to set up two bases on the Graham Land Peninsula.

From 1956 to 1958, Blaiklock was part of Vivian Fuchs's Commonwealth Trans-Antarctic Expedition that completed the first overland crossing of Antarctica. He was leader of the advance party which set up Shackleton Base and then he was part of the crossing party during which, with Jon Stephenson, they drove dog teams to the South Pole for the first time since Amundsen. Blaiklock completed the Antarctic crossing by reaching Scott Base aboard the Sno-Cat "County of Kent".

From 1959 to 1961, Blaiklock joined the second Belgian Antarctic Expedition with Captain Bastin which failed to reach the South Pole. In 1965 he worked for the British Antarctic Survey on Adelaide Island and on the Antarctic Peninsula. He did more survey work in the Antarctic and for Decca in the North Sea before retiring in 1996.

Blaiklock died of pneumonia and bowel cancer on 20 September 2020.

== Honours ==
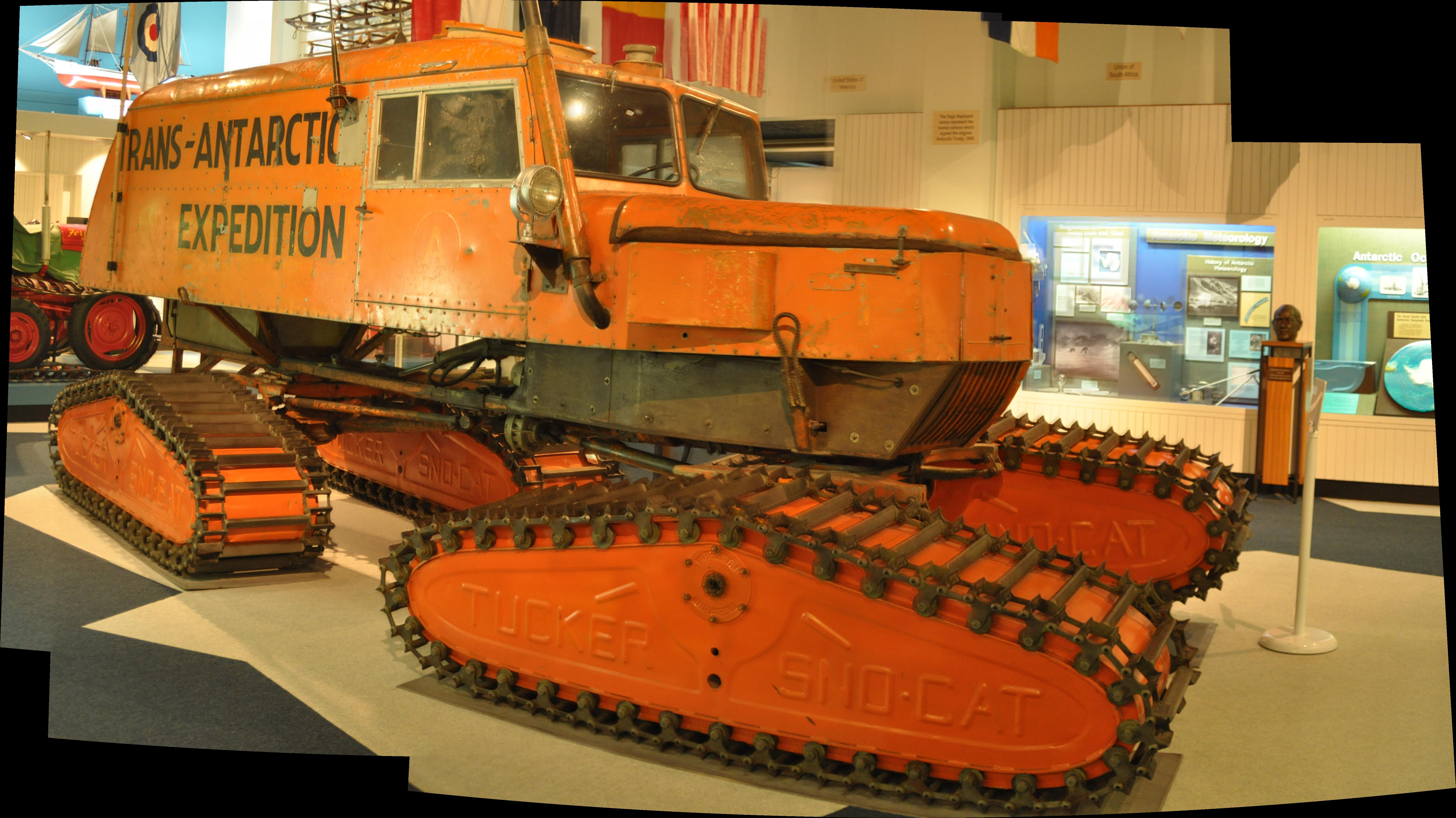
A Tucker Sno-Cat used in the Commonwealth Trans-Antarctic Expedition.

Blaiklock was awarded the Polar Medal with three bars, the Cuthbert Peek Award in 1957 by the Royal Geographical Society, the Chevalier de la Couronne medal in 1961 by the Belgian government, the W.S. Bruce Medal in 1962 by the Scottish Geographical Society, and in 1969 the Order of the British Empire. Blaiklock Island, the Blaiklock Glacier and the Blaiklockfjellet, all three located in Antarctica, were named after him.

== Family ==
Blaiklock's daughter is Catherine Blaiklock, former leader of the Brexit Party.
