= Gazette and Herald =

- Type: Weekly newspaper
- Format: Originally broadsheet, now tabloid
- Owner: Newsquest Media Group
- Founded: 1816
- Headquarters: Old Town, Swindon, England
- Website: www.gazetteandherald.co.uk

The Gazette and Herald is a local weekly paid-for newspaper, established in Wiltshire, England in 1816 and published every Thursday. It serves the areas and communities of Devizes, Calne, Chippenham, Royal Wootton Bassett, Swindon, Marlborough, Malmesbury, Corsham, Box and other areas in North Wiltshire.

== Overview ==
Originally the Devizes and Wiltshire Gazette, the paper expanded and took over many smaller titles. Historical copies of the Devizes and Wiltshire Gazette, dating back to 1822, are available to search and view in digitised form at The British Newspaper Archive.

It was purchased by the Swindon Press group and merged with other North Wiltshire papers owned by the group including the North Wilts Herald in 1920–22. Its head offices moved to those of the Swindon Advertiser in Swindon.

In 1956, the paper became the Gazette and Herald and is now published in three editions, each covering part of the region.

It is now owned by Newsquest Media Group, alongside sister paper the Wiltshire Times.

There is a newspaper of the same name in North Yorkshire, which serves the area of Ryedale.
