= Catherine Blaiklock =

English businesswoman and former Leader of the Brexit Party

Leader of the Brexit Party
- In office 20 January 2019 – 20 March 2019
- Preceded by: Party established
- Succeeded by: Nigel Farage

UK Independence Party Economics Spokesperson
- In office September 2018 – November 2018

Personal details
- Born: Catherine Anne Blaiklock
- Party: Independent (2026–present)
- Other political affiliations: Restore Britain (2026); English Democrats (2021–2026); Brexit Party (2019); UK Independence Party (2014–2018)
- Spouses: Gyaljen Sherpa (divorced); Christopher Kirkpatrick
- Children: 2
- Parent: Ken Blaiklock (father)
- Education: Christ Church, Oxford
- Occupation: Financial trader Hotelier
- Known for: Founding the Brexit Party; Former UKIP Economic Spokesperson

Catherine Anne Blaiklock is an English politician, financial trader and hotelier who was the founder and first leader of the Brexit Party, a political party established in January 2019 to support a no-deal Brexit. She resigned as leader in March 2019 when it was disclosed she had made anti-Islamic and racist statements online. Blaiklock had been the Economics Spokesperson for the UK Independence Party (UKIP), which she left in late 2018. Before entering politics in 2016, she worked as a financial currency and derivatives trader. She also founded a Nepali healthcare charity with her ex-husband Gyaljen Sherpa, an Everest Sherpa.

== Early life ==
Blaiklock is the daughter of polar explorer Ken Blaiklock, who moved his family to Norfolk when she was three months old, from where Blaiklock was raised until college. Blaiklock says she detested growing up in Norfolk, describing it as "intellectually devoid". As a teenager she spent four years in care homes because she had bulimia and her parents found her "wayward and difficult". Blaiklock entered Christ Church, Oxford, on a scholarship in 1981, the second year the College admitted women. She studied geography and climatology. She then went to India on a Commonwealth Scholarship.

== Professional career ==
Blaiklock worked as a financial currency and derivatives trader with Merrill Lynch and other investment banks, and was located in New York, Tokyo and Singapore. She returned to Asia and founded a health care charity in Nepal, called Nepal in Need, with her then-husband Gyaljen Sherpa, with which, as of 2015, she was still involved, and for which she continued to raise funds. Since returning to Norfolk in 1999, she has run a guest-house and other small businesses in the local hospitality sector.

== Political career ==
=== UKIP (2014–2018) ===
Blaiklock joined UKIP in 2014, having never voted before, and said that she only really entered politics after the 2016 United Kingdom European Union membership referendum. She was the unsuccessful UKIP candidate for Great Yarmouth in the 2017 general election. During the campaign, she produced photographs of her British Jamaican husband to argue that UKIP was not racist. In September 2018, she was appointed the Economic Spokesman of UKIP, was the Eastern Regional Chair, and wrote articles for UKIP in The Daily Telegraph. Blaiklock left UKIP in 2018 when Gerard Batten appointed the English Defence League's Tommy Robinson as a personal advisor.

=== Brexit Party (January–July 2019) ===
On 20 January 2019, Blaiklock launched a pro-Brexit political party called the Brexit Party, and listed her Norfolk guest house as the headquarters. She immediately outlined her desire for former UKIP leader Nigel Farage to lead her new Brexit Party, and on 8 February 2019, Farage announced he would be a candidate for the Brexit Party in any upcoming European Parliament elections. In a 27 February interview, Reuters said: "Blaiklock wants Britain to leave the EU without a trade deal and says the threat of economic damage from a potentially disorderly no-deal Brexit has been vastly exaggerated".

On 20 March 2019, Blaiklock resigned as party leader after The Guardian enquired about deleted anti-Islam messages from her Twitter account from before she took on the role. Her deleted tweets were recovered by the advocacy group, Hope not Hate. They included comments such as "Islam = submission – mostly to raping men it seems" and "8 people waiting for lift, 5 Muslim girls, 1 black, 1 other Asian Chinese, 1 white. Immediately outside saw a drug deal take place. Looked like Turkey." Nigel Farage, leader of the Brexit party, described her comments about Islam as "horrible and intolerant". In May 2019, The Guardian reported that Blaiklock still remained as a Director of the Brexit Party.

=== Attempt to join Conservative Party (August 2019) ===
Blaiklock applied to join the Conservative Party on 23 July, the day of Boris Johnson's victory in the 2019 Conservative Party leadership election, and received a membership number on 6 August. However, a few days after her public disclosure of her application, the Conservative Party, who said her application was subject to final approval, rejected her application, with Blaiklock saying: "And it was central office who cancelled it even though the local branch knows who I am".

=== English Democrats (2021–2026) ===
On 3 July 2021 in The Salisbury Review, Blaiklock announced she had joined the English Democrats. She spoke at their autumn conference that year, and following the murder of Southend West's previous member of Parliament, Sir David Amess, in Leigh-on-Sea on 15 October, they subsequently nominated her in early January 2022 to stand for them at the constituency's by-election, held on 3 February. Labour, the Liberal Democrats, the Greens and other mainstream political parties chose not to contest the seat out of respect, and Blaiklock came fourth with 320 votes (2.15%).

In the 2024 general election, she stood in Great Yarmouth, receiving 171 votes (0.4%). The seat was won by Rupert Lowe, the Reform UK candidate. Lowe has since founded Restore Britain after he was suspended from Reform UK on 7 March 2025.

Blaiklock stood for the English Democrats in the 2025 Runcorn and Helsby by-election, coming 12th, receiving 95 votes and losing her deposit.

== Views ==
Blaiklock posted articles on The Conservative Woman where she discussed introducing hanging for drug dealers and argued that food banks are contributing to obesity in low-income families, who should be eating potatoes, being cheaper and healthier. She has also been noted for her anti-Islam statements written on a range of conservative websites.

In January 2019, The Guardian reported that, in blogs and tweets since deleted, she had "argued crime and fatherlessness among black men are due to high testosterone levels, and suggested their lower academic achievement could have a biological basis".

== Personal life ==
Blaiklock’s first husband was Gyaljen Sherpa whom she met in 1997 at Everest base camp in Nepal, (Note: The Nepali in Need website notes that Gyaljen Sherpa summited Everest and was involved in the 1996 Mount Everest disaster.) and with whom she has two children. Her second husband is a British Jamaican, Christopher Kirkpatrick.

As of February 2019, Blaiklock ran a guest house from her home in Lingwood in Norfolk called The Annapurna Guest House. Her husband managed the guest house on a day-to-day basis, and the BBC reported in February 2019 that its Tripadvisor page has been the subject of politically motivated attacks and "malicious trolling", requiring intervention by Tripadvisor.

== See also ==
- 2019 European Parliament election in the United Kingdom
- Leader of the Brexit Party

== Notes ==
Party political offices
New political party	Leader of the Brexit Party; 2019	Succeeded by Nigel Farage
