= Jennifer McGarigle =

American designer

Jennifer McGarigle (born May 29, 1970) is an American designer specializing in floral arrangements, event décor, design classes and home furnishings. As the owner of Floral Art in Venice, CA she has been featured in The New York Times, Los Angeles Times, Singular Magazine, the "Best of Los Angeles" for LA Magazine, and In Style, among other publications. She has also appeared on various television programs including LXTV Open House, Good Day LA and the Tori and Dean Show. She has designed parties and tabletop décor for The Oprah Winfrey Show and has consulted on floral design for corporations including the Bellagio Hotel in Las Vegas.

In 2009, the Floral Art Home Collection launched, featuring collections of modern furnishings and accessories inspired by flowers. Her furniture designs have been featured in Architectural Digest, and O Magazine. In 2012, her "Floral Lace Chair" was included among Apartment Therapy's 2012 Design Showcase, which featured thirty of the best new creations for the home
