= Edward Musgrave Blaiklock =

New Zealand Biblical academic (1903–1983)

- Born: 6 July 1903; Birmingham, England
- Died: 26 October 1983 (aged 80)
- Occupation: Biblical academic
- Spouse: Kathleen Minnie (nee Mitchell)
- Children: two sons

Academic background
- Education: Auckland University College
- Alma mater: University of New Zealand (DLitt)
- Thesis: (1946)

Academic work
- Discipline: Biblical studies
- Institutions: Mount Albert Grammar School; University of Auckland

Edward Musgrave Blaiklock OBE (6 July 1903 – 26 October 1983) was chair of classics at the University of Auckland from 1947 to 1968, and champion of Christian apologetic literature in New Zealand from the 1950s until his death in 1983.

== Biography ==
=== Childhood ===
Edward Musgrave Blaiklock was born on 6 July 1903 in Birmingham, England, to Edward Blaiklock and Florence Blaiklock (née Tromans). In 1909 the family emigrated to Auckland, New Zealand, and the next year they purchased a 30-acre (12 ha) farm on the outskirts of Titirangi. Blaiklock received his primary education at Avondale Side School and New Lynn School, and his secondary education at Auckland Grammar School.

=== Teaching ===
Blaiklock was accepted by the Auckland Education Board as a pupil-teacher and taught at Avondale School for a year, then spent 1921 and 1922 at Auckland Training College. He also spent this time studying for a BA degree at Auckland University College. In 1921 Blaiklock attended an evangelistic meeting at Auckland Baptist Tabernacle in Queen Street where he heard Joseph Kemp preach, and became a Christian as a result. In 1923 Blaiklock was appointed as a teacher at Mount Albert School. He completed his BA in 1924, and was appointed to teach languages at Mount Albert Grammar School in 1925. While there he introduced soccer to the school and inaugurated a secondary schools soccer competition.

=== Classics and lectureship ===
Continuing his studies at Auckland University, Blaiklock completed an MA degree in Latin and French with first-class honours in 1925, and also a second first-class honours degree in Latin. He attracted the attention of Classics professor A. C. Paterson who, unlike his predecessor H. S. Dettman, encouraged Blaiklock's interest in the study of Greek, and granted him a lectureship in Classics in November 1926. Blaiklock gave his first lecture in March 1927 and over the next few years taught courses in Latin and Greek at all levels. He married Kathleen Minnie Mitchell at the Baptist Tabernacle on 13 November 1928. Edward and Kathleen went on to have two sons.

Classics chair A. C. Paterson died suddenly in 1933, and although Paterson had been grooming Blaiklock as his successor, the university preferred instead to appoint Charles Cooper. A deep divide developed between the two scholars, and in 1940 Blaiklock was made directly responsible for teaching Greek, with Cooper responsible for Latin. During this time Blaiklock published The male characters of Euripides, for which the University of New Zealand awarded him the degree of LittD in 1946. In 1945 he and his family moved to Titirangi, where Blaiklock and his wife resided for the remainder of their lives.

=== Chair of classics and leading Christian apologist ===
In 1941, Blaiklock was invited to write as a columnist for the Weekly News by editor H. I. Macpherson. When the Weekly News was retired Blaiklock continued in the Sunday Herald, and then the New Zealand Herald. His column went under the name "Grammaticus". In 1947, upon the sudden resignation of Charles Cooper, Blaiklock was appointed to the chair of Classics. He went on to hold the office of public orator, and was a member of the New Zealand Literary Fund Advisory Committee from 1958 to 1964.

During the 1960s and 1970s Blaiklock produced a large volume of literature in the fields of biblical studies and Christian apologetics. He was regarded by many as New Zealand's own champion of traditional Christian belief against the swell of modernist and liberal theology occurring at that time. In 1968 he published Layman's Answer: An examination of the new theology, an answer to the claims of Lloyd Geering. The same year he retired from his university chair, but continued to write for evangelical organisations such as Scripture Union. He worked with his son David A. Blaiklock to produce Is It, or Isn't It?: Why We Believe in the Existence of God. E. M. Blaiklock served as president of the Baptist Union of New Zealand in 1971, and in 1974 was awarded an OBE for 'services to scholarship and the community'. He also found work as a guide for tour parties to the biblical lands of the Middle East, Greece and Italy.

=== Newspaper columnist ===
Known to many thousands as "Grammaticus", Blaiklock wrote a column in the now-defunct Weekly News and the Sunday Herald and, after April 1975, in the New Zealand Herald. His articles appeared for more than 40 years, without missing a week.

=== Death ===
Blaiklock's wife Kathleen died in February 1978, which affected him deeply. He continued for a time to lead tour parties overseas, but a few years later became a victim of cancer, and died on 26 October 1983.

=== Obituary ===
The Dictionary of New Zealand Biography gives Blaiklock the following description:

As a lecturer in Classics and as a lay preacher, Blaiklock…established himself as a natural communicator who could build a close rapport with an audience, carrying them along on the current of his own enthusiasm. He was helped in this by a handsome countenance, an athletic build, a strong, clear voice, and a commanding presence, backed up by a fluent command of English and a wide reading in his own and related fields.

== Works ==
=== Books ===
- Blaiklock, E. M. (1950). Not Made to Die: An Examination of the Christian Doctrine of Man. The Institute Printing and Publishing Society.
- ——— (1951). The Christian in Pagan Society. London: Tyndale Press.
- ——— (1951). The Seven Churches: An Exposition of Revelation Chapters Two and Three. Marshall, Morgan & Scott.
- ——— (1952). The Male Characters of Euripides: A Study in Realism. Wellington, New Zealand: New Zealand University Press.
- ——— (1957). Out of the Earth: The Witness of Archaeology to the New Testament (1st ed.). Grand Rapids, MI: Eerdmans. OCLC 3602655.
- ——— (1959). Faith Is the Victory: Devotional Studies in the First Epistle of John. Grand Rapids, MI; London: Eerdmans; Paternoster Press.
- ——— (1959). Rome in the New Testament. Inter-Varsity Fellowship.
- ——— (1959). The Acts of the Apostles: An Historical Commentary. Tyndale New Testament Commentaries. Vol. 5. Grand Rapids, MI: Eerdmans. OCLC 978533.
- ——— (1971) [1959]. Acts: An Introduction and Survey. Tyndale New Testament Commentaries. Vol. 5. Tyndale Press. ISBN 978-0-851-11606-8.—UK edition
- ——— (1961). Out of the Earth: The Witness of Archaeology to the New Testament (2nd ed.). Grand Rapids, MI: Eerdmans. OCLC 2335135.
- ——— (1962). The Century of the New Testament. Christian books for the modern world. London: Inter-varsity Fellowship. OCLC 1803785.
- ——— (1964). Our Lord's Teaching on Prayer. Grand Rapids, MI: Zondervan.
- ——— (1964). From Prison in Rome: Letters to the Philippians and Philemon. Grand Rapids, MI: Zondervan.
- ——— (1965). Ten Pounds an Acre. A. H. & A. W. Reed.
- ——— (1965). Cities of the New Testament. London: Pickering & Inglis.
- ——— (1965). The Young Man Mark: Studies in Some Aspects of Mark and His Gospel (1st ed.). London: Paternoster Press. published as In the Image of Peter, Moody, 1969.
- ——— (1965). Cities of the New Testament. Revell.
- Grammaticus (1966). Hills of Home. Tri-Ocean. - Blaiklock under pseudonym "Grammaticus"
- ——— (1966). St. Luke. Grand Rapids, MI: Eerdmans.
- ——— (1966). Understanding the New Testament. London: Scripture Union.
- Grammaticus (1968). Green Shade. A. H. & A. W. Reed. - Blaiklock under pseudonym "Grammaticus"
- ——— (1968). The Way of Excellence: A New Translation and Study of I Corinthians 13 and Romans 12. London: Pickering & Inglis.
- ——— (1968). St. Luke. Scripture Union Bible Study Books. London: Scripture Union.
- ———; Blaiklock, David A. (1968). Is It, or Isn't It?: Why We Believe in the Existence of God (1st ed.). Grand Rapids, MI: Zondervan. OCLC 448565.
- ——— (1968). Layman's Answer: An Examination of the New Theology. Judson.
- ——— (1969). In the Image of Peter (2nd ed.). MoodyPress. - reissue of the title The Young Man Mark
- ———; Blaiklock, David A. (1969). This Faith or That (2nd ed.). London: Pickering & Inglis. - Reissue in the UK of Is It, or Isn't It?: Why We Believe in the Existence of God
- ———, ed. (1969). The Zondervan Pictorial Bible Atlas. Grand Rapids, MI: Zondervan. OCLC 47455.
- ——— (1969). Word Pictures from the Bible (1st ed.). London: Pickering & Inglis.
- ——— (1970). The Archaeology of the New Testament. Contemporary Evangelical Perspectives (1st ed.). Grand Rapids, MI: Zondervan. OCLC 64735.
- ——— (1970). The Psalms of the Great Rebellion: An Imaginative Exposition of Psalms 3 to 6 and 23. London: Marshall, Morgan & Scott.
- ——— (1971). Romans. Bible Study Books. Vol. 16. London: Scripture Union.
- ——— (1971). Word Pictures from the Bible (US ed.). Grand Rapids, MI: Zondervan.
- ———, ed. (1971). Why I Am Still a Christian. Zondervan Horizon Book. Grand Rapids, MI: Zondervan. OCLC 143422.
- ——— (1972). The Pastoral Epistles: A Study Guide to the Epistles of I and II Timothy and Titus. Grand Rapids, MI: Zondervan. OCLC 375986.
- ———; Blaiklock, David A. (1972). Why Didn't They Tell Me?. Grand Rapids, MI: Zondervan.
- ——— (1974). Who Was Jesus?. Moody Press.
- ——— (1974). The Positive Power of Prayer. Regal Books. ISBN 9780830702978.
- ——— (1977). Blaiklock's One Volume Commentary on the Bible. Old Tappan, NJ: Revell.
- ——— (1977). Letter to Children of Light: A Bible Commentary for Laymen in 1, 2, 3 John (2nd ed.). Old Tappan, NJ: Revell.
- ——— (1977). First Peter. Waco, TX: Word Books. ISBN 9780849900068. OCLC 3750904.
- ——— (1977). Commentary on the Psalms: Volume I: Psalms for Living: Psalms 1–72. London: Scripture Union.
- ——— (1977). Commentary on the Psalms: Volume II: Psalms for Worship: Psalms 73–150. London: Scripture Union.
- ——— (1977). Commentary on the New Testament. London: Hodder & Stoughton, 1977. ISBN 978-0-340-22216-4. OCLC 4640728.
- ——— (1978). The Answer's in the Bible. London: Hodder & Stoughton.
- ——— (1978). Luke. London: Scripture Union.
- ——— (1979). Meditations on the Psalms, four volumes. London: Scripture Union.
- ——— (1979). Acts: The Birth of the Church. Old Tappan, NJ: Revell.
- ——— (1979). Between the Valley and the Sea. The Dunmore Press.
- ——— (1979). The World of the New Testament. Arc Publishing.
- ——— (1980). Blaiklock's Handbook to the Bible. Old Tappan, NJ: Revell.
- ——— (1980). Between the Morning and the Afternoon. The Dunmore Press.
- ——— (1980). Still a Christian. London: Hodder & Stoughton.
- ——— (1980). Eight Days in Israel. Ark Press.
- ——— (1980). Kathleen: A Record of Sorrow. London: Hodder & Stoughton.
- ——— (1981). Between the Foothills and the Ridge. The Dunmore Press.
- ——— (1981). Blaiklock's Book of Bible Persons. Ark Press.
- ———; Harrison, R. K., eds. (1983). The New International Dictionary of Biblical Archaeology. Grand Rapids, MI: Zondervan. ISBN 978-0-310-21250-8. OCLC 8727822.
- ——— (1983). Jesus Christ six weeks to Eternity. Anzea.
- ——— (1984). The Archaeology of the New Testament (revised and updated ed.). Nashville, TN: Thomas Nelson. ISBN 978-0-840-75889-7. OCLC 946519978.
- ——— (1983). Jesus Christ Man or Myth?. Anzea.
- Grammaticus (1984). More, David (ed.). The best of Grammaticus: Writings of Professor E. M. Blaiklock. Wilson & Horton. ISBN 0-86864-069-7.
- ——— (1987). Today's Handbook of Bible Characters. Minneapolis, MN: Bethany House. ISBN 978-0-871-23948-8. OCLC 15489431. - reprint of Blaiklock's Handbook to the Bible
- ——— (1989). The Compact Handbook of New Testament Life. Minneapolis, MN: Bethany House. ISBN 9781556610615. - reprint of The World of the New Testament
- ———. Two letters from Prison. The Institute Press.
- ———. No Mists Above. The Institute Printing & Publishing Society.

=== Chapters ===
- ——— (1962). "various entries". In Douglas, James D. (ed.). New Bible Dictionary. Tyndale Press.
- ——— (1962). "various entries". In ——— (ed.). The Zondervan Pictorial Bible Dictionary. Grand Rapids, MI: Zondervan.
- ——— (1967). "various entries". In Turnbull, Ralph G. (ed.). Baker's Dictionary of Practical Theology. Grand Rapids, MI: Baker Books. ISBN 978-0-801-08786-8.
- ——— (1975). "Decapolis". In Tenney, Merrill C. (ed.). The Zondervan Pictorial Encyclopedia of the Bible. Vol. 2. Grand Rapids, MI: Zondervan. pp. 81–84.

=== Articles ===
- ——— (1964). "The Areopagus Address". Faith and Thought. 93 (3): 175–191.

=== Translator ===
- (Translator) Thomas a Kempis, The Imitation of Christ, Thomas Nelson, 1980.
- (Translator) Thomas a Kempis, Brother Lawrence, Thomas Nelson, 1982.
- (Translator) The Practice of the Presence of God: Based on the Conversations, Letters, Ways, and Spiritual Principles of Brother Lawrence, as well as on the Writings of Joseph de Beaufort, Thomas Nelson, 1982.
- (Translator) The Confessions of Saint Augustine: A New Translation with Introductions, Thomas Nelson, 1983.
- (Translator with C.C. Keys) The Little Flowers of Saint Frances: The Acts of Saint Francis and His Companions, Servant Books, 1985.

Also author of monographs on classical and religious subjects; archaeological editor of Pictorial Encyclopedia of the Bible, Zondervan. Columnist, under pseudonym Grammaticus, in Auckland Weekly News, 1942–. Contributor of editorials, articles, and reviews to classical journals in United States and United Kingdom and to New Zealand newspapers.

== Bibliography ==
- Shaw, Trevor R. (1986). E. M. Blaiklock: A Christian Scholar. London; Auckland, New Zealand: Hodder & Stoughton. ISBN 978-0340401354. OCLC 28670696.
