= Henry Musgrave Blaiklock =

English architect and civil engineer

Henry Musgrave Blaiklock (26 April 1790 – 9 October 1843) was an English architect and civil engineer who came to Canada with extended family in the 1820s to pursue his career.

Blaiklock and his family arrived in Quebec around 1824. They were influenced in their decision to emigrate by an invitation from Governor George Ramsay to whom they were related. He and his brother George had quick success in their architectural business, no doubt aided by the governor's patronage.

Blaiklock was Clerk of Works of the Royal Engineers department from 1830 to 1843. He designed the customs building at Quebec and the Marine and Emigrants Hospital. Through these two major works he made a remarkable contribution to English neoclassicism in Quebec.
