= James William Blacklock =

New Zealand cricketer

Personal information
- Born: 31 July 1855; Melbourne, Australia
- Died: 21 April 1907 (aged 51); Wellington, New Zealand
- Source: Cricinfo, 23 October 2020

James William Blacklock (31 July 1855 – 21 April 1907) was a New Zealand cricketer. He played in seven first-class matches for Wellington from 1877 to 1884.

== See also ==
- List of Wellington representative cricketers
