= American Institute of Floral Designers =

US organization

The American Institute of Floral Designers (AIFD), established in 1965, is a non-profit organization dedicated to recognizing and promoting the art of floral design as a professional career. It has 6 regional chapters in the United States and Canada.

== Membership ==
The American Institute of Floral Designers offers two designations to candidates who have demonstrated advanced professional ability of floral artistry: AIFD (Accredited in Floral Design) and CFD (Certified Floral Designer).

Candidates are first evaluated through an online test, and if successful, by a panel of examiners at the annual AIFD Symposium. In the latter stage, the candidate prepares 5 floral designs, which are graded according to artistic and technical criteria specified in the AIFD Guide to Floral Design.

To maintain membership, accredited designers are required to document continuing education in the field.
