= Gift basket =

Gift delivered to the recipient at their home or workplace

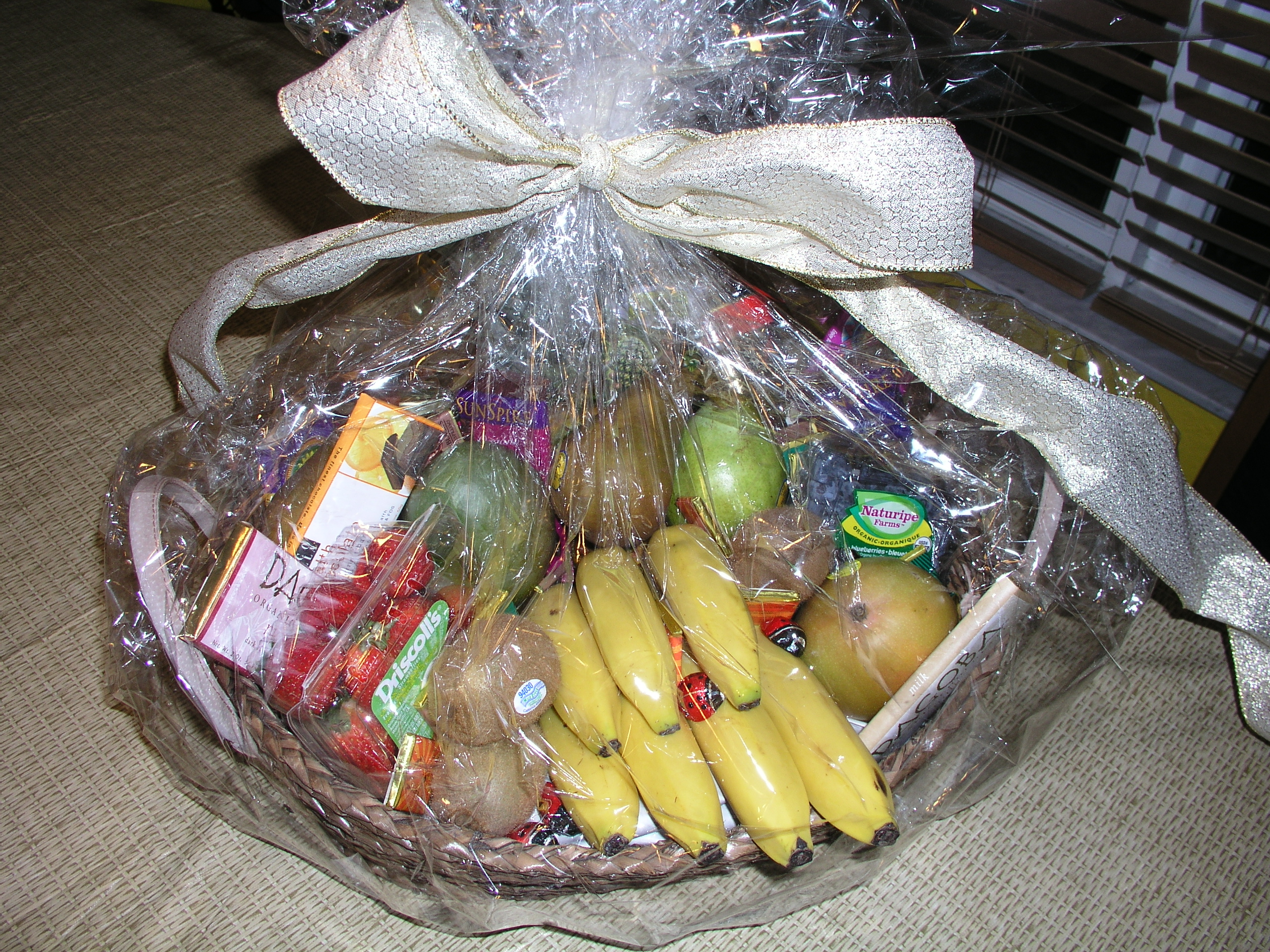
A standard gift basket

A gift basket or fruit basket is typically a gift delivered to the recipient at their home or workplace. A variety of gift baskets exist: some contain fruit; while others might contain dry or canned foods such as tea, crackers and jam; or the basket might include a combination of fruit and dried good items. Gourmet gift baskets typically include exotic fruit, and often include quality cheese and wine, as well as other nonfood items. Gift baskets are often sent for special occasions—such as holidays—or as a thank-you or congratulations gift. In certain occasions, it is given as a sympathy gift or a condolence gift during funerals. In some countries in Asia, people use fruit baskets as decoration. They either eat it after the funeral service where the casket is laid in the cemetery or they leave the fruit baskets at their graves to let the dead rest in peace.

== Fruit bouquet ==
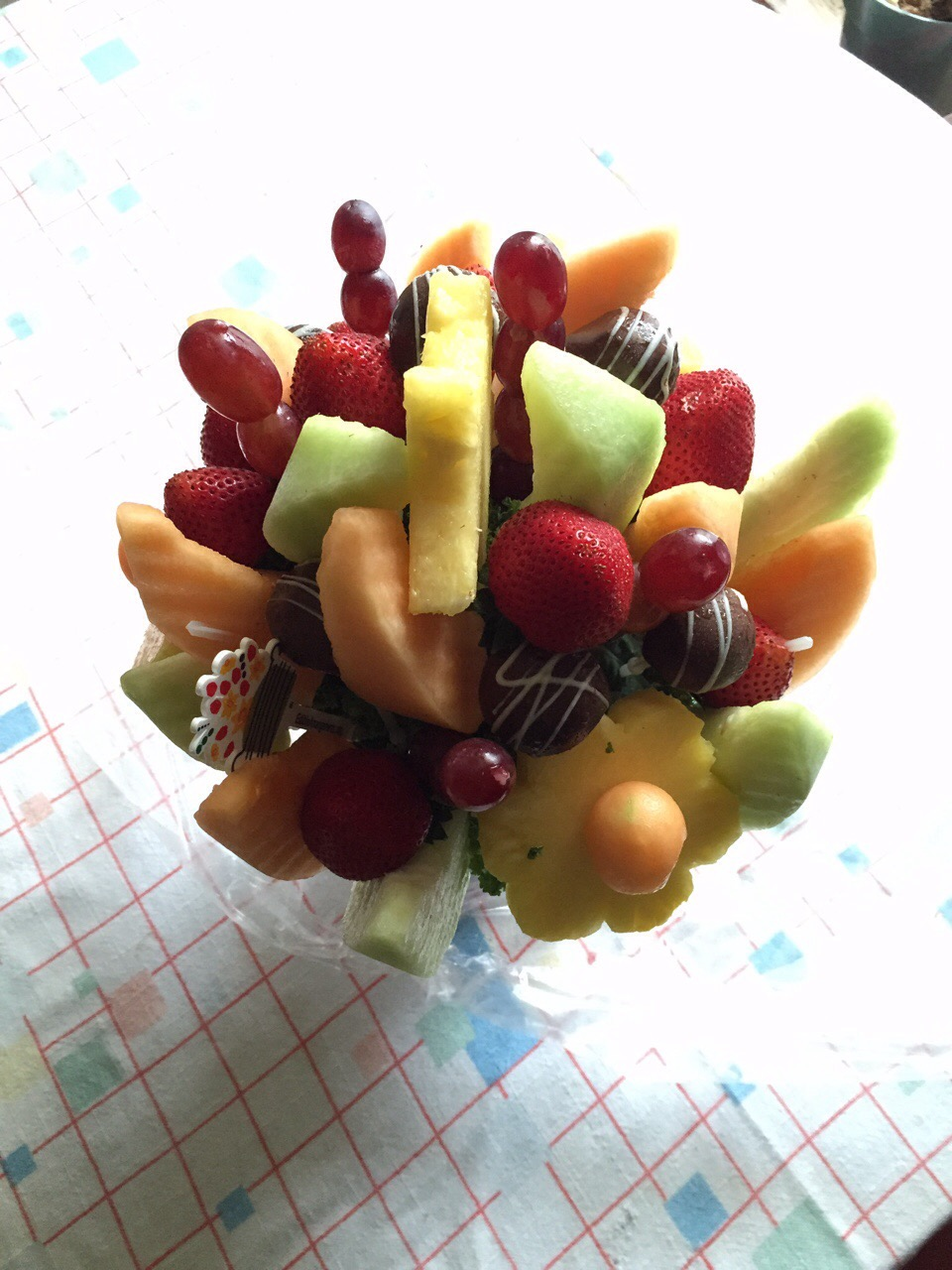
Fruit bouquet

A fruit bouquet is a fruit arrangement in the form of bouquet. The fruit is cut in the shape of flowers and leaves, and is arranged in the container with the help of sticks. A complete arrangement looks like a bouquet of flowers. Typically, a fruit bouquet is delivered to the recipient at their home or workplace.

Often these bouquets will be made to suit the recipients' needs, such as diabetic, vegan, vegetarian, gluten intolerance or wheat intolerance. Common fruit bouquet items include apples, artichokes, avocados, bananas, cheeses, grapes, lychees, mangoes, oranges, papayas, pineapples, pomegranates, strawberries, and Chocolates.

== Common contents ==
=== Perishable foods ===
==== Fruits ====
- Apples
- Avocados
- Bananas
- Grapes
- Mangoes
- Oranges
- Papayas
- Pineapples
- Pomegranates
- Strawberries
- Apple-pears
- Blood orange
- Cherimoya
- Kiwi
- Feijoa
- Kumquats
- Lychee
- Passion Fruit
- Persimmons
- Rambutan
- Raspberry
- Sapotes
- Cantaloupe
- Peach

==== Other Perishable Foods ====
- Artichokes
- Bread
- Cheese
- Eggs (see Easter basket)

=== Dry, canned or bottled goods ===
- Champagne
- Chocolate
- Coffee
- Crackers
- Honey
- Jam or Marmalade
- Liqueur
- Nuts
- Sparkling beverage or premium/organic soft drinks
- Tea
- Wine

=== Non-edibles ===
- Cash
- Cut flowers
- Plants
- Promotional merchandise
- Stuffed animals

== Literature ==
- Phillips, Diane (2005). The Perfect Basket. Harvard Common Press. ISBN 1-55832-294-9.

== See also ==
- Flower bouquet
- Vegetable bouquet
- Floral design
