= Machmoum =

Tunisian flower bouquet of jasmine

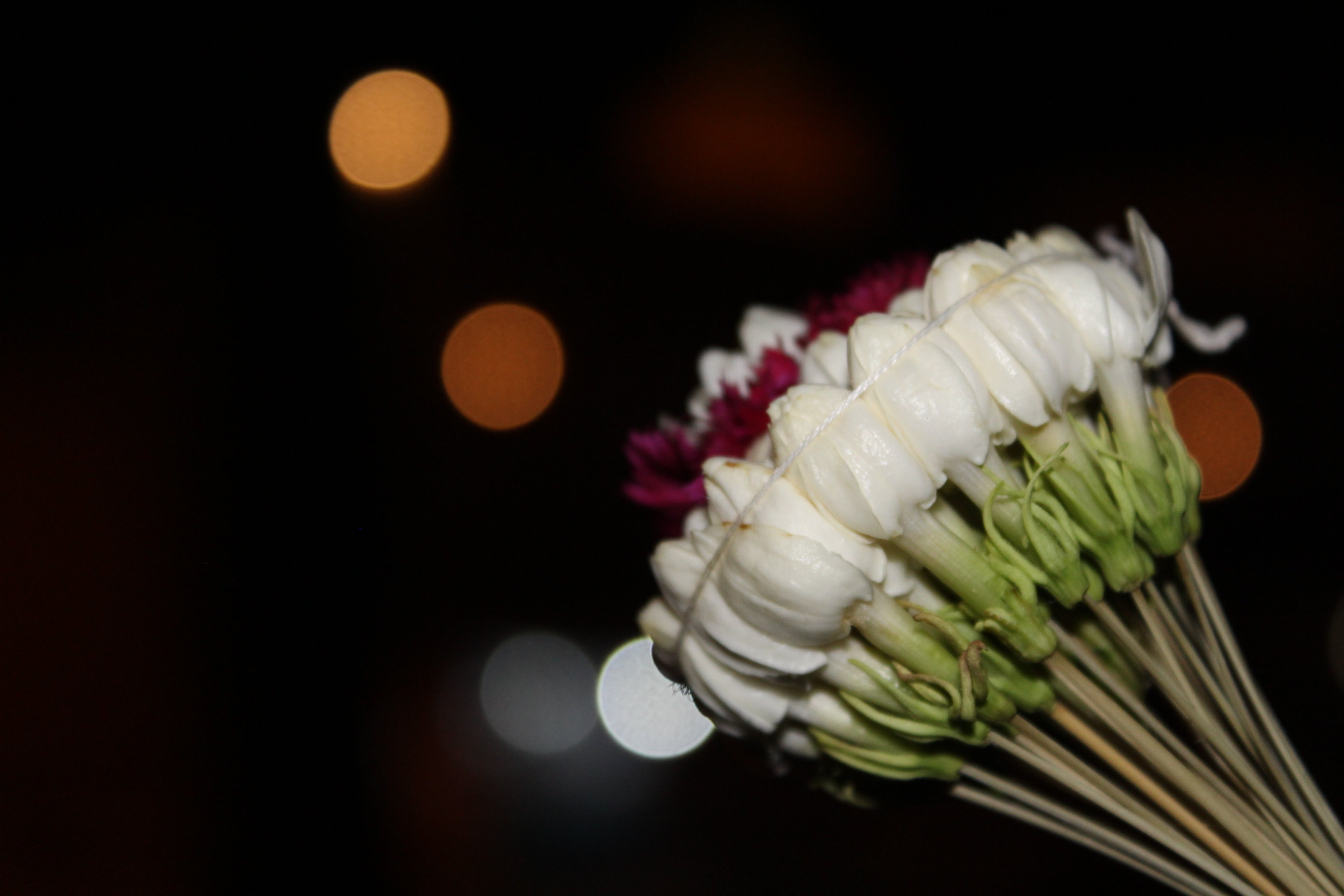
A Machmoum picture

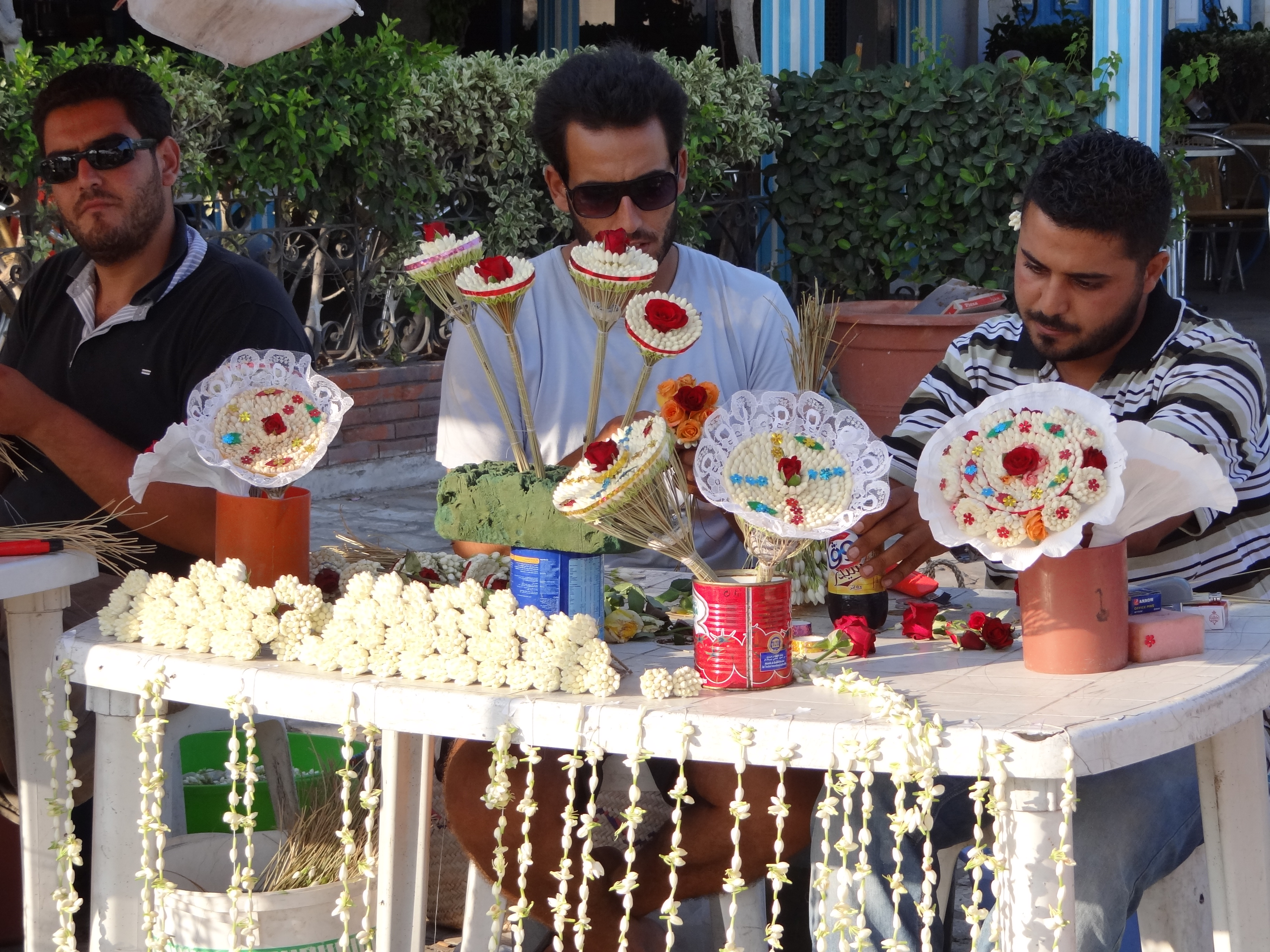
Machmoum manufacturing and sale stand

A machmoum (Arabic: مشموم) is a small flower bouquet or necklace made of jasmine or full (Arabian Jasmine), specific to Tunisia. It is sold during the summer in the afternoon or in the evening.

The men wear it on their ear, the women in their cleavage or carry it by hand.

Similar garlands and necklaces of full are sometimes made and worn in Egypt.
