= Boutonnière =

Small floral arrangement worn on the lapel

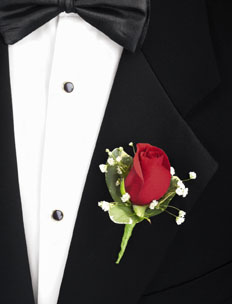
A boutonnière worn pinned on the lapel of a dinner jacket

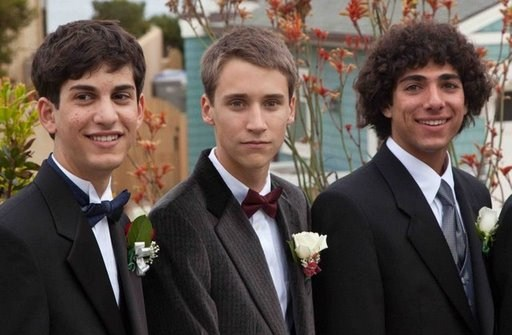
Young men wearing boutonnières

A boutonnière (French: [bu.tɔ.njɛʁ]) or buttonhole (British English) is a floral decoration, typically a single flower or bud, worn on the lapel of a tuxedo or suit jacket.

Traditionally and most simply, a boutonnière is a single flower, worn pushed through the lapel buttonhole (on the left, the same side as a pocket handkerchief). Today boutonnières are often instead pinned to the front of the lapel, and feature more than a single stem: leaves or accents, constituting a mini-bouquet, like a smaller corsage. See § Wearing for details and variations.

While worn frequently in the past, boutonnières are now usually reserved for special occasions for which formal wear is standard, such as at proms and weddings. Women who wear jackets on these occasions may also wear boutonnières, but more typically a woman would wear a corsage. Nowadays, lapel pins are worn more often than flowers on business suits.

== History ==
The word boutonnière derives from the French word for "buttonhole". Similar to a wedding bouquet, in the 16th century, boutonnières were used to ward off bad luck and evil spirits. They were also used to keep bad scents away and were believed to protect against diseases.

In the 18th century, however, many wore boutonnières as fashion statements. They were put on the buttonholes of frock coats. In most parts of Europe during this time, it was normal for men to wear fashionable clothes that included not only a boutonnière, but also breeches and boots. The French soon began to incorporate this style as well.

During the 19th century, boutonnières became popular with followers of the Romantic movement, adding fresh color to attire. This was one of the many accessories that a man could add to his clothing to make him stand out from the crowd, similar to picking a pair of well-polished shoes. Other popular accessories were chains, cigar cases and jeweled pins.

In the 20th century, after World Wars I and II, the wearing of a flower on the lapel remained popular. Although worn less commonly as time went on, a boutonnière served as a symbol of good breeding, elegance and sophistication. This was due partly to the influence of cinema.

Today, boutonnières are still part of a man's formal attire, chiefly used on special occasions such as weddings, proms or ceremonies. When worn at a wedding or prom, they often match the flowers (corsages) of the bride or date. There are many types and styles of boutonnières to choose from. In some cases, the groom, his groomsmen and the father of the bride all wear boutonnières, adding a touch of elegance to the important occasion.

== Flowers ==
The flower itself is often a carnation, of which the most formal is white. The classic alternative is one in clove red. Other colours and flowers may also be chosen to better coordinate with whatever else is being worn, such as a blue cornflower. A white gardenia is sometimes seen as a superior alternative to carnations, given its scent and beauty.

At the University of Oxford in the United Kingdom, it is a tradition that students wear carnation boutonnières while attending their formal examinations. This boutonnière is worn on the lapel of the student's subfusc, the style of formal academic dress at the university, but is not a compulsory part of the attire. The colour of the carnation indicates which examination the student is taking in that run of exams. At the first examination, a white carnation is worn, at subsequent intermediate examinations, a pink carnation is worn, and at the final examination, a red carnation is worn.

== Wearing ==
Boutonnières are traditionally worn on the left lapel, the traditional location for the buttonhole, and the same side as a pocket handkerchief. Some style guides recommend against wearing both a boutonnière and a pocket handkerchief, to avoid crowding. More permissive guides permit both, but suggest keeping one or both simple.

Traditionally, a boutonnière is worn pushed through the lapel buttonhole, which is on the left side. The stem can be held in place with a boutonnière loop on the back of the lapel (a thick thread below and parallel to the buttonhole), or with a pin. Boutonnière loop are rarely included on current coats, and are traditionally a mark of high-quality tailoring, but are easy to add by a tailor or oneself.

A prepared boutonnière, inserted deep into the buttonhole so it lies flat.

The flower is preferably inserted into the buttonhole so the petals lie flat and secure against the lapel, rather than sticking out and moving about. This is difficult if the flower has a large calyx, such as for a carnation, and requires a large buttonhole of at least 1 1/8 in (29 mm) long for there to be enough room to fit a standard-sized flower's calyx. A traditional alternative, rarely practiced today, is to cut off the calyx and leaves (optionally trimming the stem to thin it further), and remove the pistil, then secure the petals and stem with non-marking floral tape. This thins the flower and allows it to be easily and tightly inserted into the buttonhole.

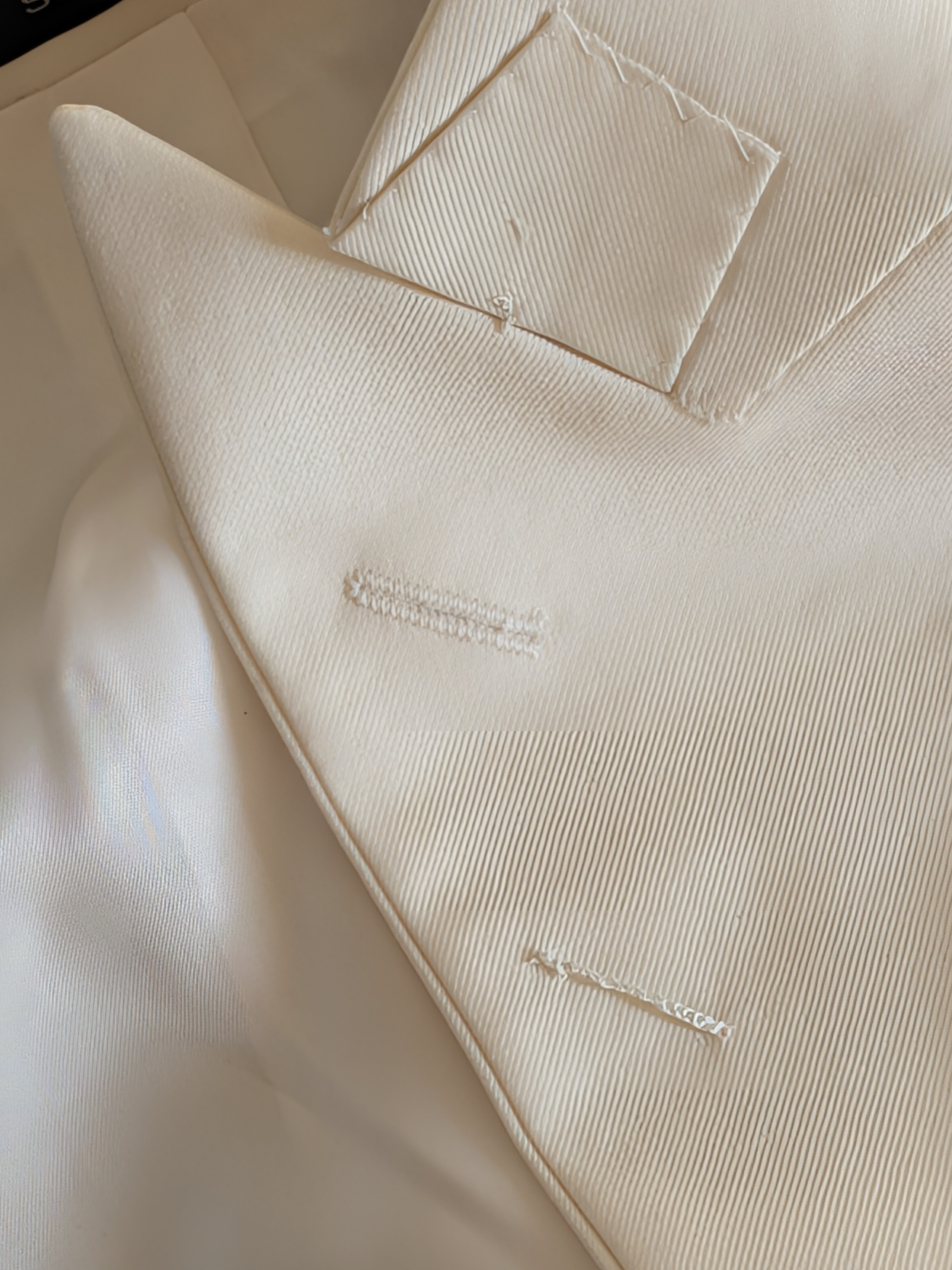
A boutonnière loop, to hold the stem in place.

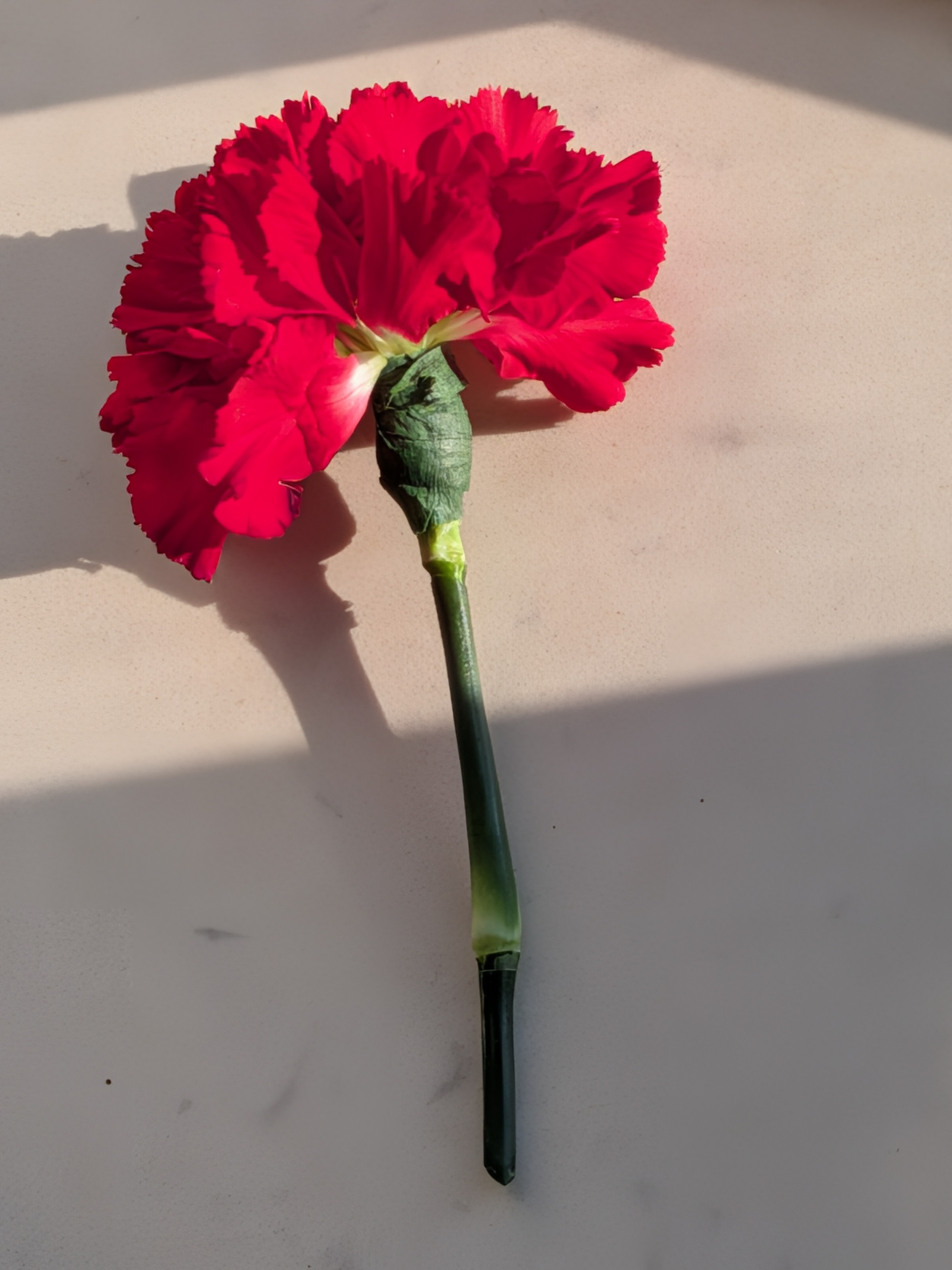
A carnation prepared to be a boutonnière, with calyx removed and replaced by floral tape.

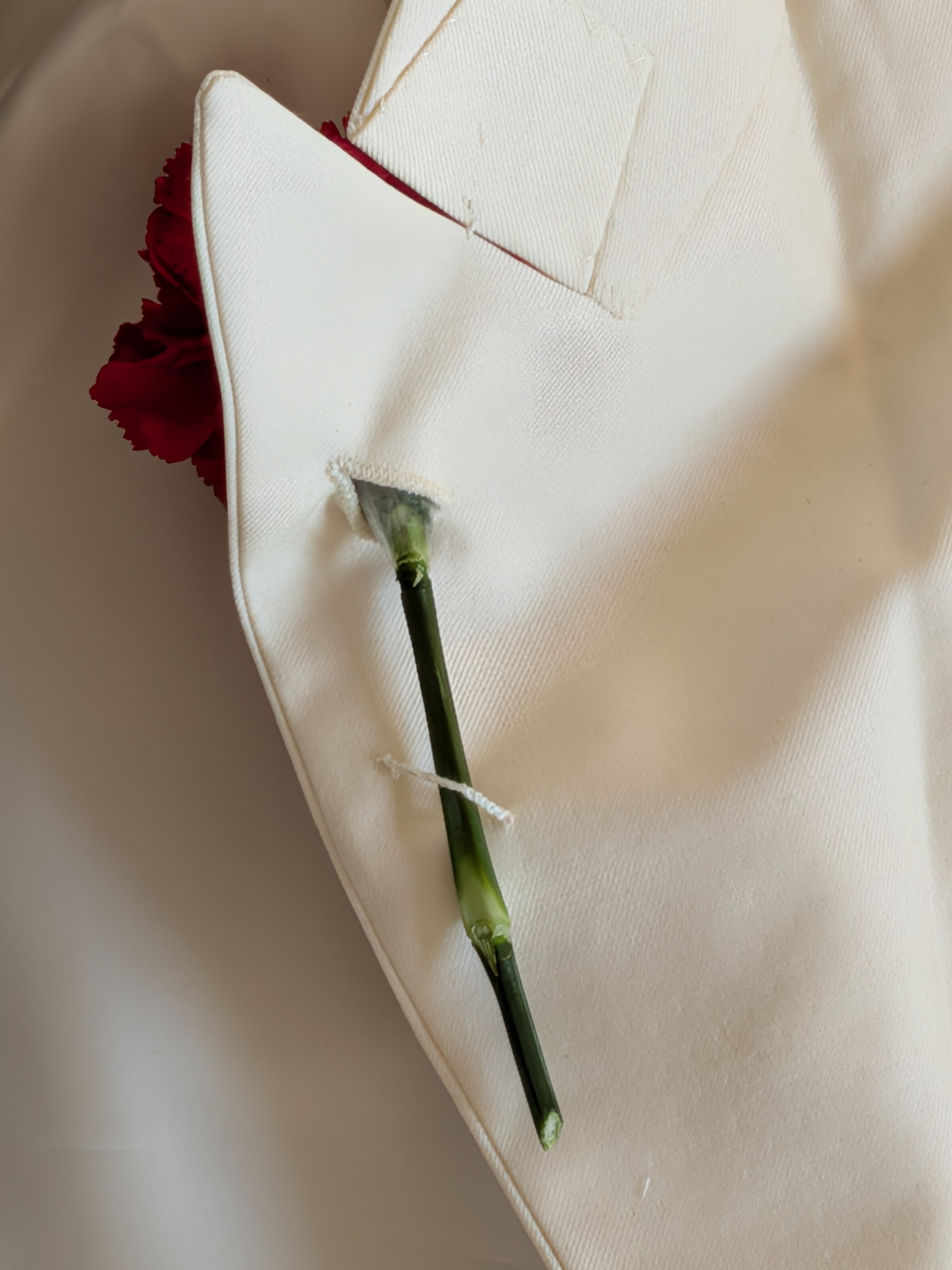
A prepared carnation inserted into a buttonhole and boutonnière loop.

Today boutonnières are most often pinned onto the jacket lapel, although this may be considered unsightly, and continued pinning could eventually damage the cloth or silk facing. Pinning is necessary if the buttonhole is not pierced through (though buttonholes can be opened with a seam ripper), or for larger arrangements that cannot fit through a buttonhole.

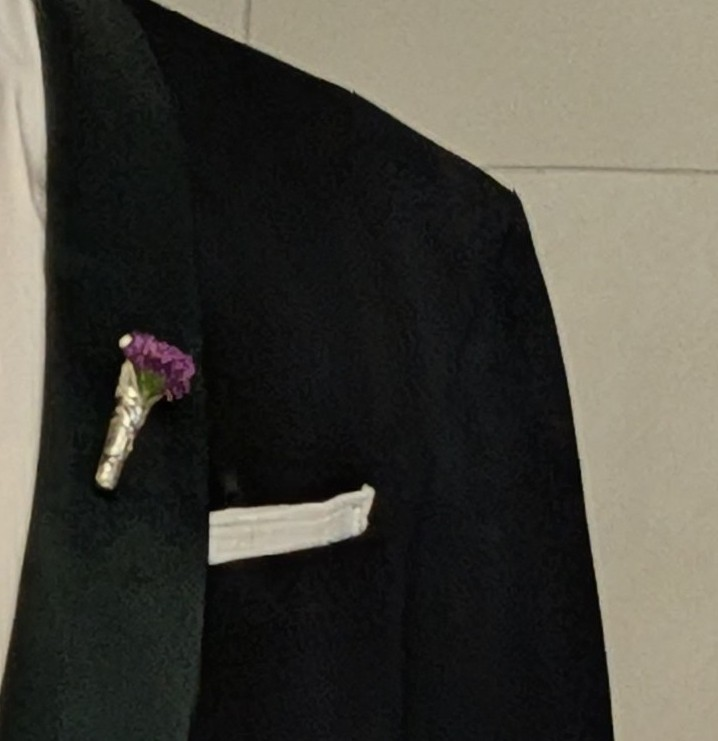
A small metal boutonnière vase, with a tiny flower inside.

A traditional alternative, rare today, is a boutonnière vase, a small vase used to hold the boutonnière; compare posy holders. This may be worn in front of the lapel or behind, and may be designed for very small flowers. The character Hercule Poirot is the best-known media portrayal of this. These may be attached to the lapel by a hook, a pin, or, today, a magnet.

== Shawl collars ==
Shawl collars do not traditionally feature buttonholes, since they developed from smoking jackets (and before that, dressing gowns), which do not fasten, rather than coats. Thus, boutonnières are often pinned to shawl collars. However, two alternatives exist.

External images
- Shawl collars with buttonholes
- A white dinner jacket with a shawl collar with a buttonhole, worn by William Holden in Sabrina (1954)
- The Duke of Windsor enjoys a cigar, 11th July 1960, featuring a shawl collar with two button holes
- A shawl collar with a buttonhole, from Quantum of Solace (2008; image is in mirror, so buttonhole is on the left lapel)

Firstly, some shawl collars feature buttonholes, in spite of tradition. This is usually a single buttonhole on the left side, as on peaked or notched lapels, but can also be two matching buttonholes, one on each side. The designer Tom Ford often uses a buttonhole on his shawl collars, as featured in the James Bond movie Quantum of Solace (2008). Shawl collars with two buttonholes were used by the Duke of Windsor, as in the 1960 image linked above.

Secondly, some shawl collars feature a small pocket behind the left lapel, where the stem of a boutonnière may be placed and then peek out from behind the collar.

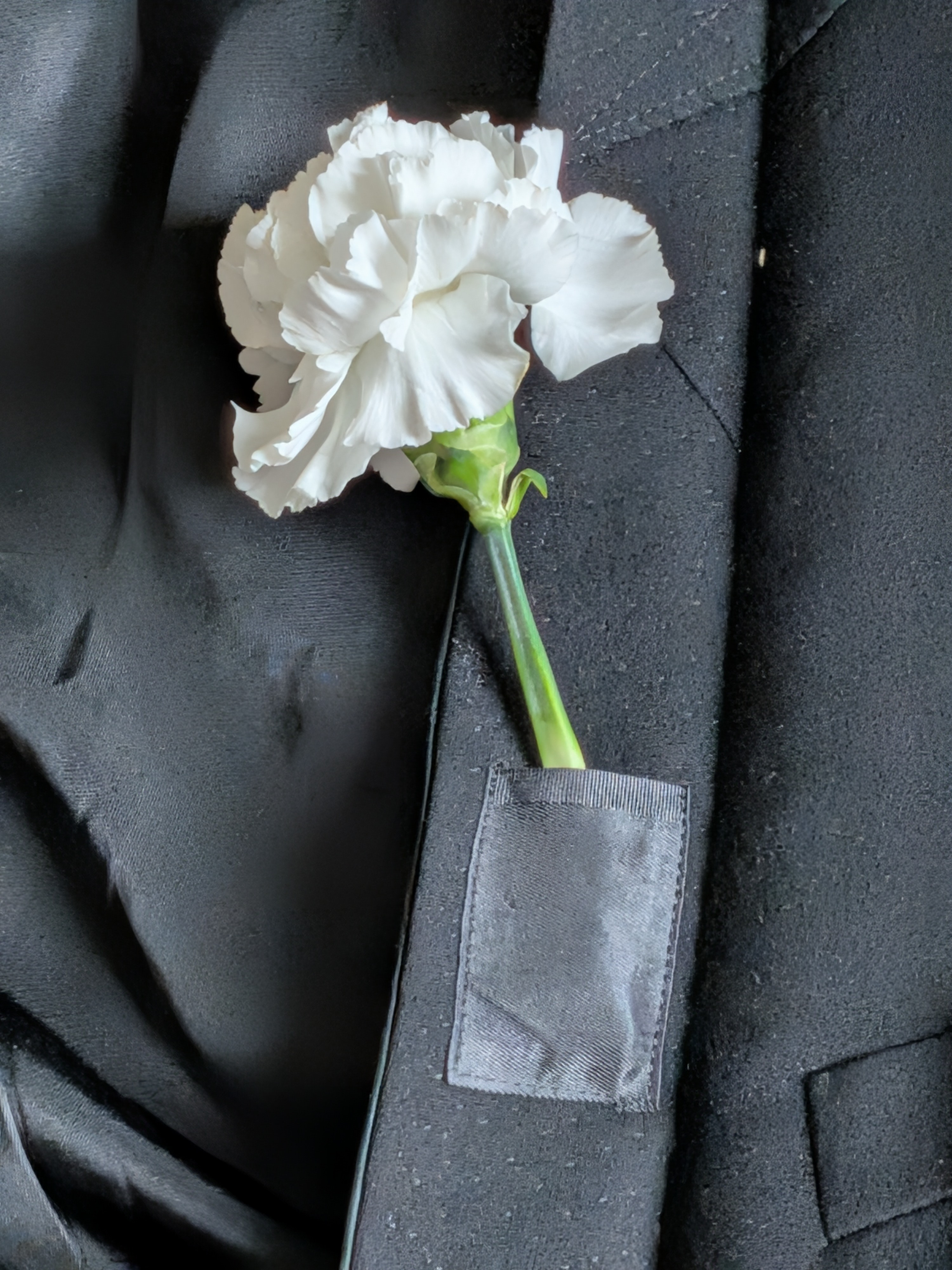
Boutonnière pocket on the reverse of a shawl collar

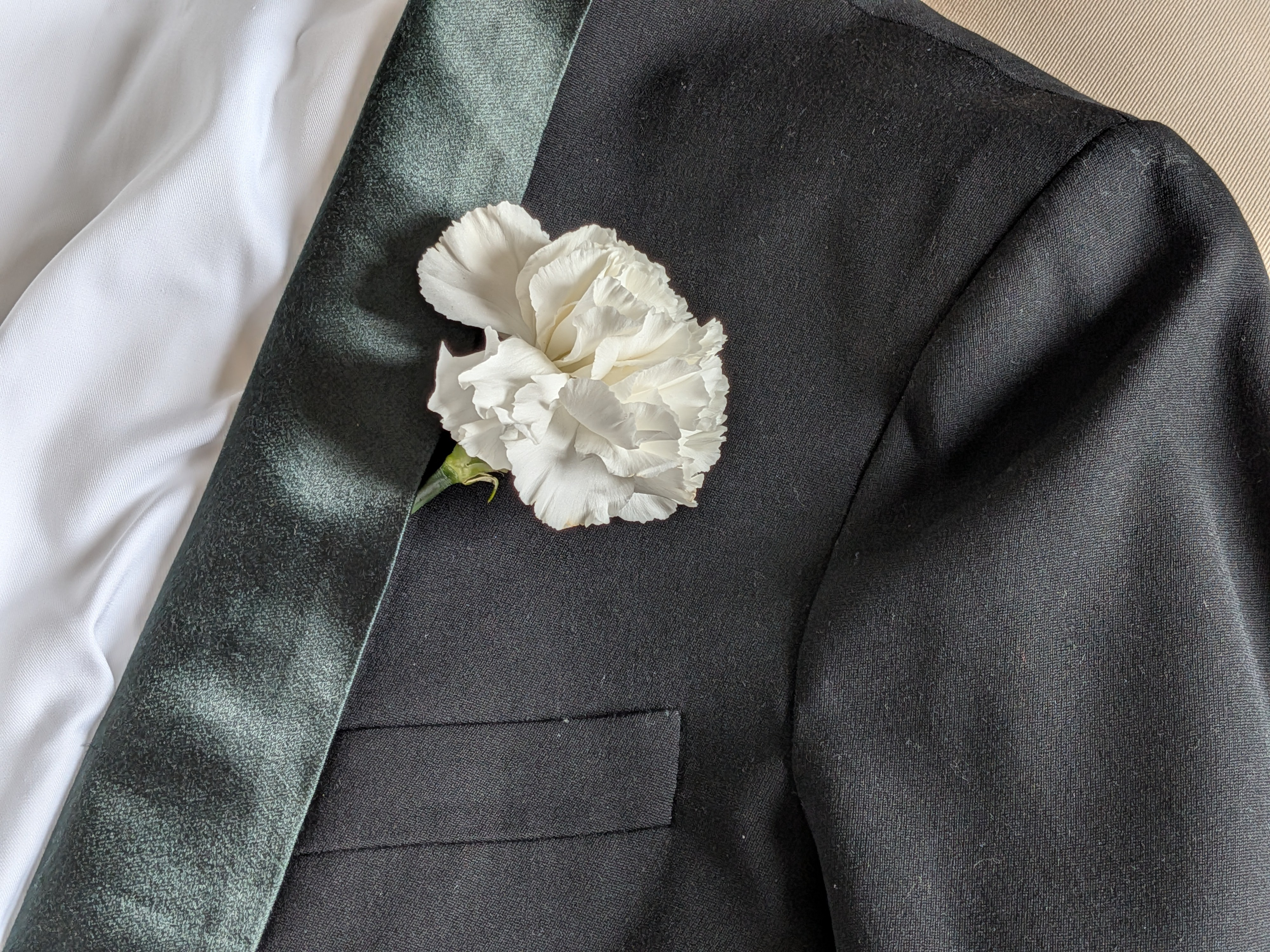
Boutonnière in pocket, peeking out from behind a shawl collar
