= Ring a Ring o' Roses =

Folk song

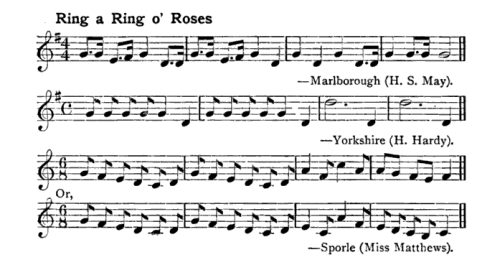
- Melodies for "Ring a Ring o' Roses", from Alice Gomme's 1898 work.

Nursery rhyme
- Published: 1881

"Ring a Ring o' Roses", also known as "Ring a Ring o' Rosie" or "Ring Around the Rosie" in the United States, is a nursery rhyme, folk song, and playground game. Descriptions first appeared in the mid-19th century, though it is reported to date from decades earlier. Similar rhymes are known across Europe, with varying lyrics. It has a Roud Folk Song Index number of 7925.

The origin of the song is unknown. Pagan myth or folklore were proposed as origins at the end of the 19th century. In the mid-20th-century, it was suggested that the song reflects the Great Plague or earlier outbreaks of bubonic plague in England, with the plague's rash, protective posies of herbs, symptoms of sneezing, and finally falling down dead. However, the symptoms do not align closely with the song; the explanation emerged centuries after the plague; and European and 19th-century versions of the song do not match the interpretation either.

== Song ==
=== Lyrics and actions ===
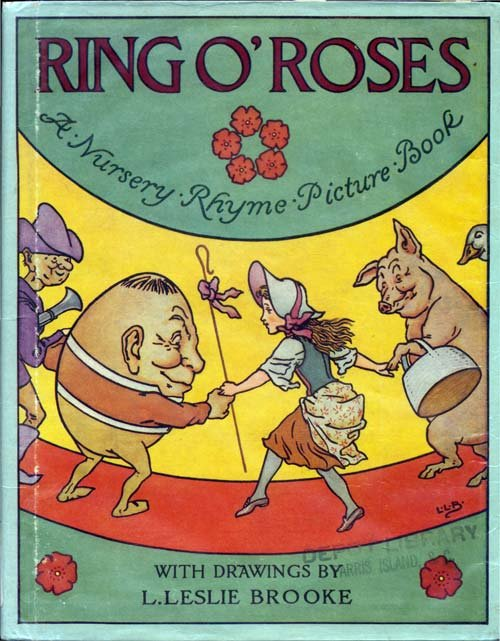
The cover of L. Leslie Brooke's Ring O' Roses (1922) shows nursery rhyme characters performing the game

The origins and earliest wording of the rhyme remain unknown. In many versions of the game, a group of children forms a ring, dances in a circle around one person, and then stoops or curtsies on the final line. The slowest child to perform this action may face a penalty or become the "rosie" (literally: rose tree, from the French rosier), taking their place in the center of the ring.

Common British versions include:

Ring-a-ring o' roses,
A pocket full of posies.
A-tishoo! A-tishoo!
We all fall down!

Common American versions include:

Ring around the rosie,
A pocket full of posies.
Ashes! Ashes!
We all fall down!

Some versions replace the third line with "Red Bird Blue Bird" or "Green Grass-Yellow Grass", and the ending may be changed to "Sweet bread, rye bread, Squat!" Godey's Lady's Book (1882) describes this variation, noting it as "One, two, three—squat!" Before the final line, the children suddenly stop, then shout it together, "suiting the action to the word with unfailing hilarity and complete satisfaction".

An Indian version ends with: "Husha busha! / We all fall down!"

=== Early attestation ===
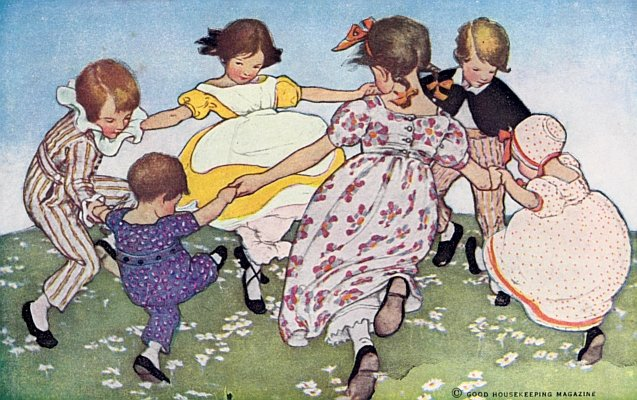
American children playing the game, illustrated by Jessie Willcox Smith in The Little Mother Goose (1912)

Variations, corruptions, and adaptations of the rhyme have been noted to exist long before its earliest printed versions. One such variation was recorded as being used in Connecticut in the 1840s. A novel from 1855, The Old Homestead by Ann S. Stephens, includes the following version:

A ring – a ring of roses,
Laps full of posies;
Awake – awake!
Now come and make
A ring – a ring of roses.

Kate Greenaway's illustration from Mother Goose or the Old Nursery Rhymes (1881)

Another early record of the rhyme appears in Kate Greenaway's Mother Goose; or, the Old Nursery Rhymes (1881):

Ring-a-ring-a-roses,
A pocket full of posies;
Hush! hush! hush! hush!
We're all tumbled down.

In his Games and Songs of American Children (1883), William Wells Newell describes several variants, including one with a melody that he dates to around 1790 in New Bedford, Massachusetts:

Ring a ring a Rosie,
A bottle full of posie,
All the girls in our town
Ring for little Josie.

Newell notes that "[a]t the end of the words the children suddenly stoop, and the last to get down undergoes some penalty, or has to take the place of the child in the centre, who represents the 'rosie' (rose-tree; French, rosier)." In an 1846 article from the Brooklyn Eagle, a different version of the game called Ring o' Roses is described. In this version, a group of young children forms a ring, from which a boy selects a girl and kisses her.

An 1883 collection of Shropshire folklore includes the following version:

A ring, a ring o' roses,
A pocket-full o' posies;
One for Jack and one for Jim and one for little Moses!
A-tisha! a-tisha! a-tisha!

On the final line, "they stand and imitate sneezing". The Opies, in their Dictionary of Nursery Rhymes, record similar variations that have appeared over time.

=== European variants ===
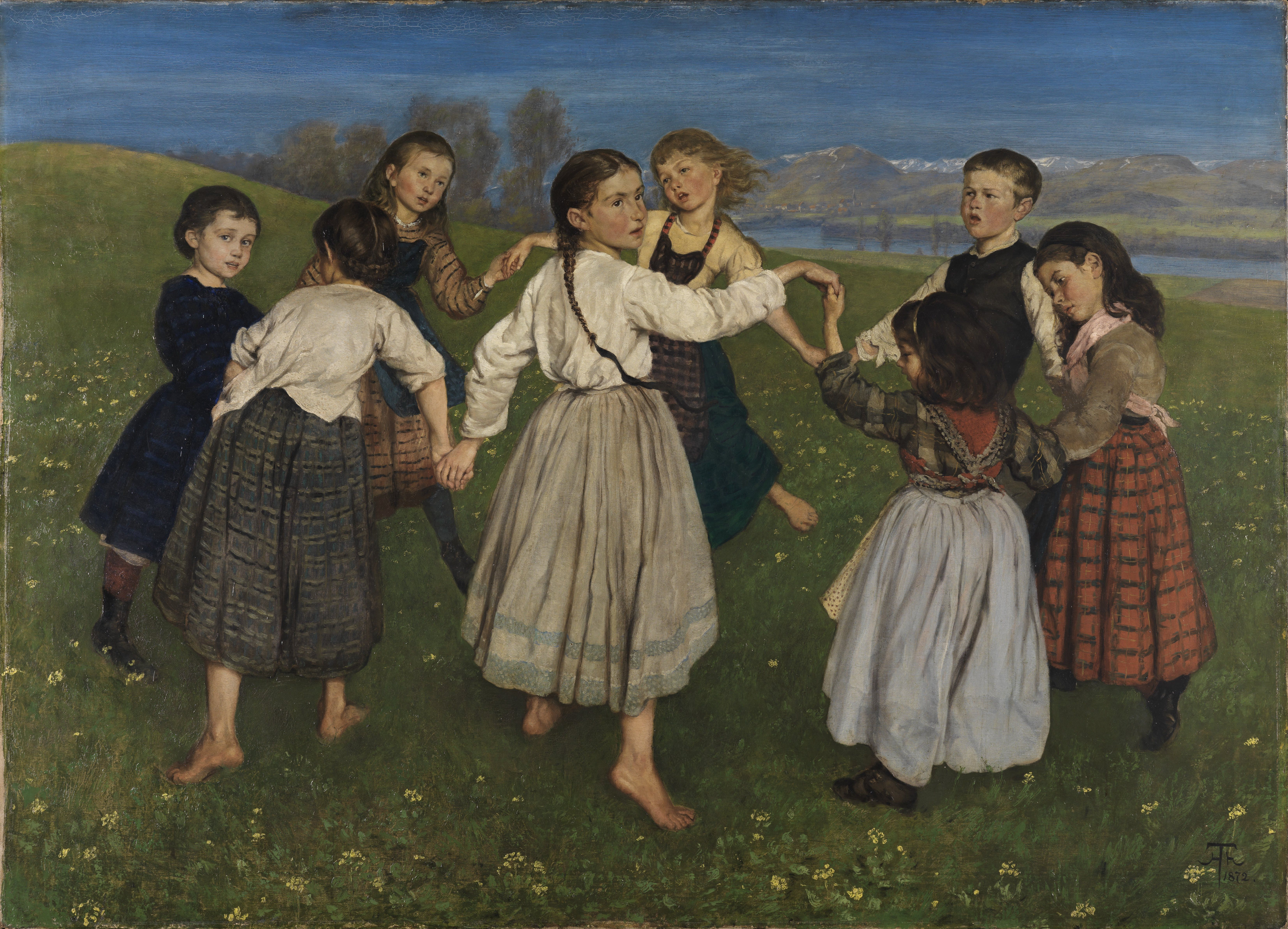
Children's Dances by Hans Thoma, 1872

A German rhyme, first printed in 1796, closely resembles "Ring a ring o' roses" in its first stanza and includes similar actions, with sitting rather than falling as the concluding gesture:

Ringel ringel reihen,
Wir sind der Kinder dreien,
Sitzen unter'm Hollerbusch
Und machen alle Husch husch husch!

A loose translation reads: "Round about in rings / We children three / Sit beneath an elderbush / And 'Shoo, shoo, shoo' go we!" This rhyme, which appears in the popular collection Des Knaben Wunderhorn, is well known in Germany and has many local variations.

Another German version reads:

Ringel, Ringel, Rosen,
Schöne Aprikosen,
Veilchen blau, Vergissmeinnicht,
Alle Kinder setzen sich!

In translation: "A ring, a ring o' roses, / Lovely apricots, / Violets blue, forget-me-nots, / Sit down, children all!"

Swiss versions of the rhyme involve children dancing around a rosebush. Other European singing games with a strong resemblance include "Roze, roze, meie" ("Rose, rose, May") from the Netherlands, which has a similar tune to "Ring a ring o' roses", and "Gira, gira rosa" ("Circle, circle, rose"), recorded in Venice in 1874. In this Italian version, girls dance around a central girl, who skips and curtsies as directed by the verses and at the end kisses the one she likes best, choosing her to be in the middle for the next round.

== Paintings ==
Evidence of similar children's round dances appears in continental paintings. For example, Hans Thoma's Kinderreigen (Children Dancing in a Ring) from 1872 depicts children dancing in an Alpine meadow, while a later version of the painting shows them dancing around a tree. The Florentine artist Raffaello Sorbi brought a similar scene into the Renaissance setting with his 1877 work Girotondo (Round Dance), where young maidens circle a child at the center to instrumental accompaniment.

The specific words to which these children danced are not recorded, but the scene's familiarity was echoed by English artists who depicted similar scenes in the 19th century. In Thomas Webster's Ring o' Roses, circa 1850, the children dance to the music of a seated clarinetist. Meanwhile, in Frederick Morgan's Ring a Ring of Roses (the title under which it was exhibited at the Royal Academy Summer Exhibition in 1885), the children are shown dancing around a tree. Two other artists associated with the Newlyn School also depicted the game: Elizabeth Adela Forbes in 1880 and Harold Harvey in a later work.

== Origin theories ==
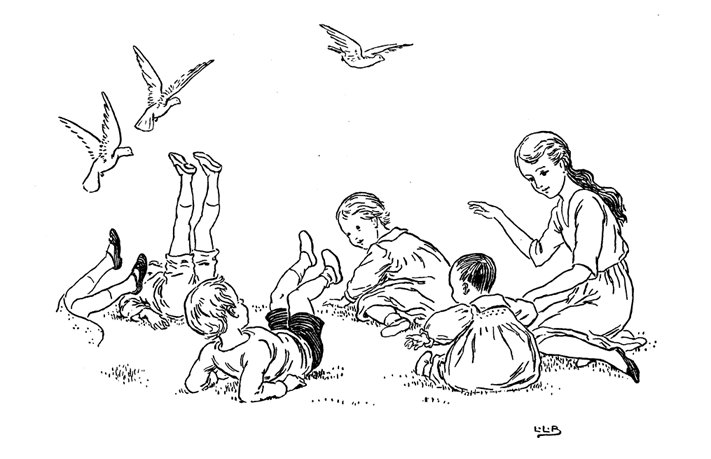
Illustration by L. Leslie Brooke (1862–1940) for "All Tumble Down" from Anon, Ring O' Roses (1922)

The origins and meanings of the game have long been unknown and are subject to speculation. Folklore scholars consider the popular explanation linking it to the Great Plague, which has been common since the mid-20th century, to be unfounded.

=== Pagan myth and folklore ===
In 1898, A Dictionary of British Folklore suggested that the game may have pagan origins. This was based on a comparison in the Sheffield Glossary with Jacob Grimm’s Deutsche Mythologie, which relates it to pagan myths. It cites a passage that reads, "Gifted children of fortune have the power to laugh roses, as Freyja wept gold", suggesting that the game’s origins may involve pagan beings of light. Another interpretation is more literal, proposing that it involved making a "ring" around roses and ending with "all fall down" as a kind of curtsy.

In 1892, the American writer Eugene Field wrote a poem titled Teeny-Weeny, which specifically described fay folk playing ring-a-rosie.

According to Games and Songs of American Children, published in 1883, the "rosie" was thought to refer to the French word for rose tree, with children dancing and bowing to the person in the center. Some variations included literal falling down, which lessened the connection to the game-rhyme's original form. In 1898, sneezing was also noted as a symbol with superstitious and supernatural significance across various cultures.

=== Great Plague ===
Since the Second World War, the rhyme has often been associated with the Great Plague of 1665 in England or with earlier outbreaks of the bubonic plague in England. However, interpreters of the rhyme before World War II make no mention of this connection. By 1951, this interpretation had become widely accepted as an explanation for the rhyme’s form that had become standard in the United Kingdom. Peter and Iona Opie, leading authorities on nursery rhymes, observed:

The invariable sneezing and falling down in modern English versions have given would-be origin finders the opportunity to say that the rhyme dates back to the Great Plague. A rosy rash, they allege, was a symptom of the plague, and posies of herbs were carried as protection and to ward off the smell of the disease. Sneezing or coughing was a final fatal symptom, and "all fall down" was exactly what happened.

The line Ashes, Ashes in colonial versions of the rhyme has been claimed to refer variously to cremation of bodies, the burning of victims' houses, or the blackening of skin due to the disease. This theory has been adapted to explain other versions of the rhyme.

Folklore scholars consider the Great Plague explanation of the rhyme to be unfounded for several reasons. Firstly, the plague explanation did not emerge until the mid-twentieth century, while the symptoms described do not align closely with those of the Great Plague. The wide variety of forms makes it unlikely that the modern version is the most ancient one, and the words on which this interpretation is based are not present in many of the earliest records of the rhyme. In addition, European and 19th-century versions of the rhyme suggest that this "fall" was not a literal falling down, but rather a curtsy or other bending movement that was common in other dramatic singing games.

=== In popular culture ===
In its various forms, the Great Plague interpretation has entered popular culture and has been referenced to make indirect connections to the plague. In 1949, a parodist created a version referencing nuclear war:

Ring-a-ring-o'-geranium,
A pocket full of uranium,
Hiro, shima
All fall down!

In March 2020, during the early stages of the COVID-19 pandemic in the United Kingdom, the traditional rhyme was humorously suggested as the "ideal choice" of song to accompany hand-washing to ward off infection.

== Sources ==
- Böhme, Franz Magnus (1897). Deutsches Kinderlied und Kinderspiel. Leipzig: Breitkopf & Härtel. pp. 438–445.
- Delamar, Gloria T. (2001) [1987]. Mother Goose, from Nursery to Literature. Lincoln, Nebraska: iUniverse. pp. 38–39. ISBN 978-0595185771.
- Gomme, Alice Bertha (1898). The Traditional Games of England, Scotland, and Ireland. Vol. 2. London: David Nutt. p. 108.
- Opie, Iona; Opie, Peter (1997) [1951]. The Oxford Dictionary of Nursery Rhymes (2nd ed.). Oxford: Oxford University Press (Nabu Press). pp. 364–365. ISBN 978-0198600886.
- Opie, Iona; Opie, Peter (1985). The Singing Game. Oxford: Oxford University Press. pp. 221–225, 227. ISBN 978-0198600886.
- Simpson, Jacqueline; Roud, Steve (2000). A Dictionary of English Folklore. Oxford: Oxford University Press. p. 296. ISBN 019210019X.
