= Flower bouquet =

Collection of flowers in a creative arrangement

A flower bouquet is a collection of flowers in a creative arrangement. Flower bouquets can be arranged for the decor of homes or public buildings or may be handheld. Several popular shapes and styles classify handheld bouquets, including nosegay, crescent, and cascading bouquets. Flower bouquets are often given for special occasions such as birthdays, anniversaries or funerals. They are also used extensively in weddings and at the Olympic medal ceremonies. Bouquets arranged in vases or planters for home decor can be placed in traditional or modern styles. According to the culture, symbolism may be attached to the types of flowers used.

== History ==
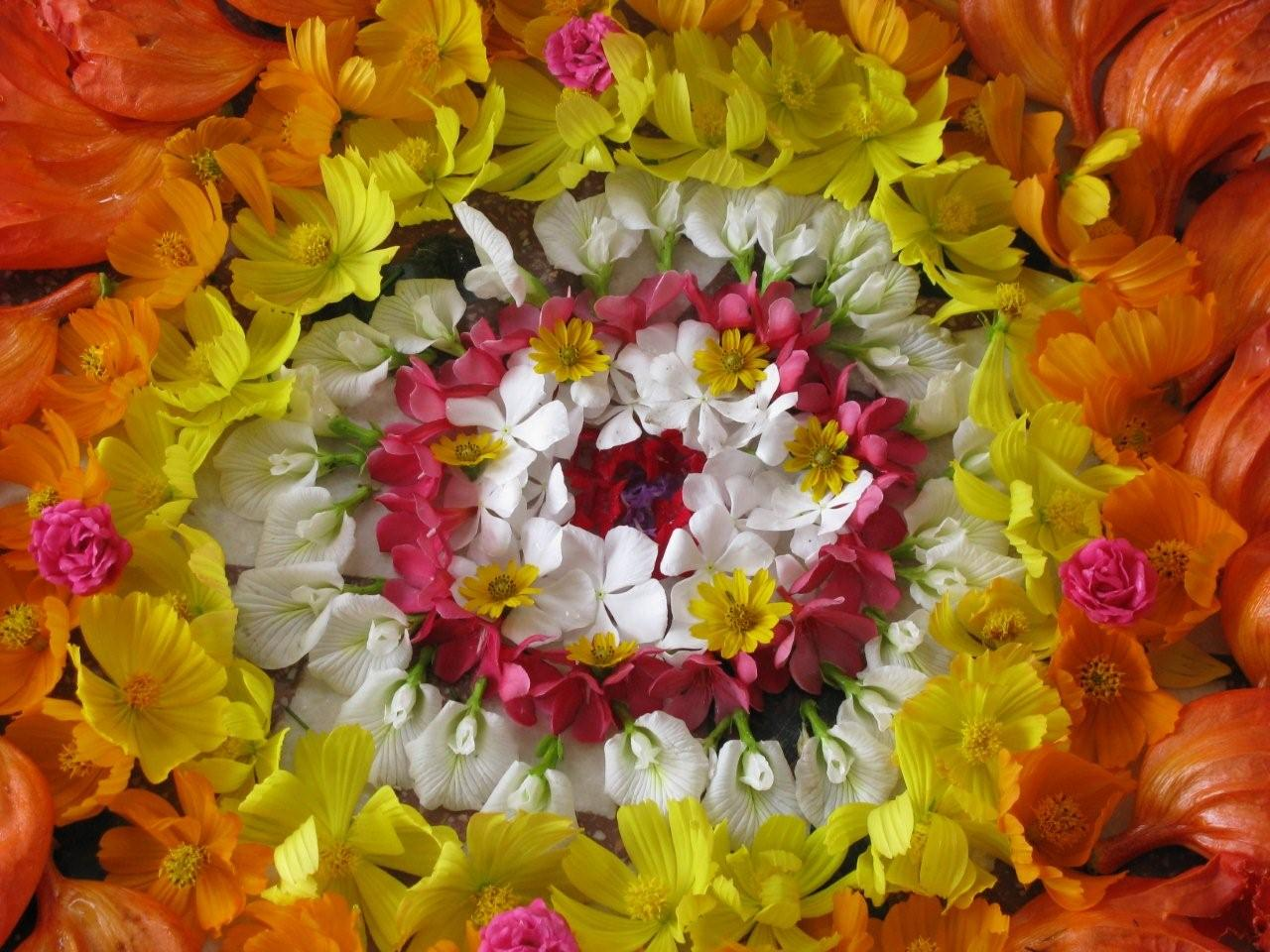
Fresh flowers are arranged in front of houses to celebrate Onam, a major celebration in Kerala, India.

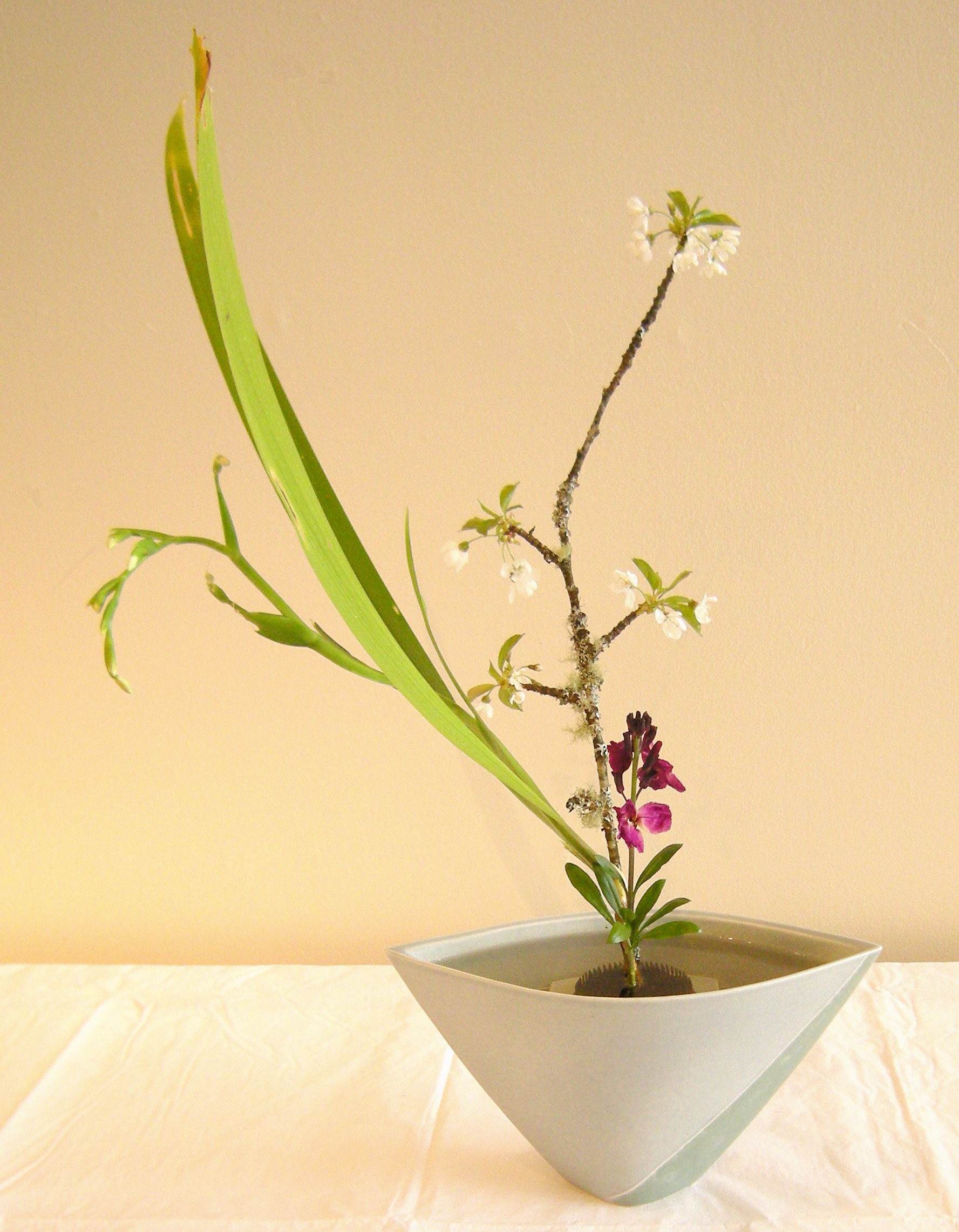
A Japanese ikebana flower bouquet in a vase

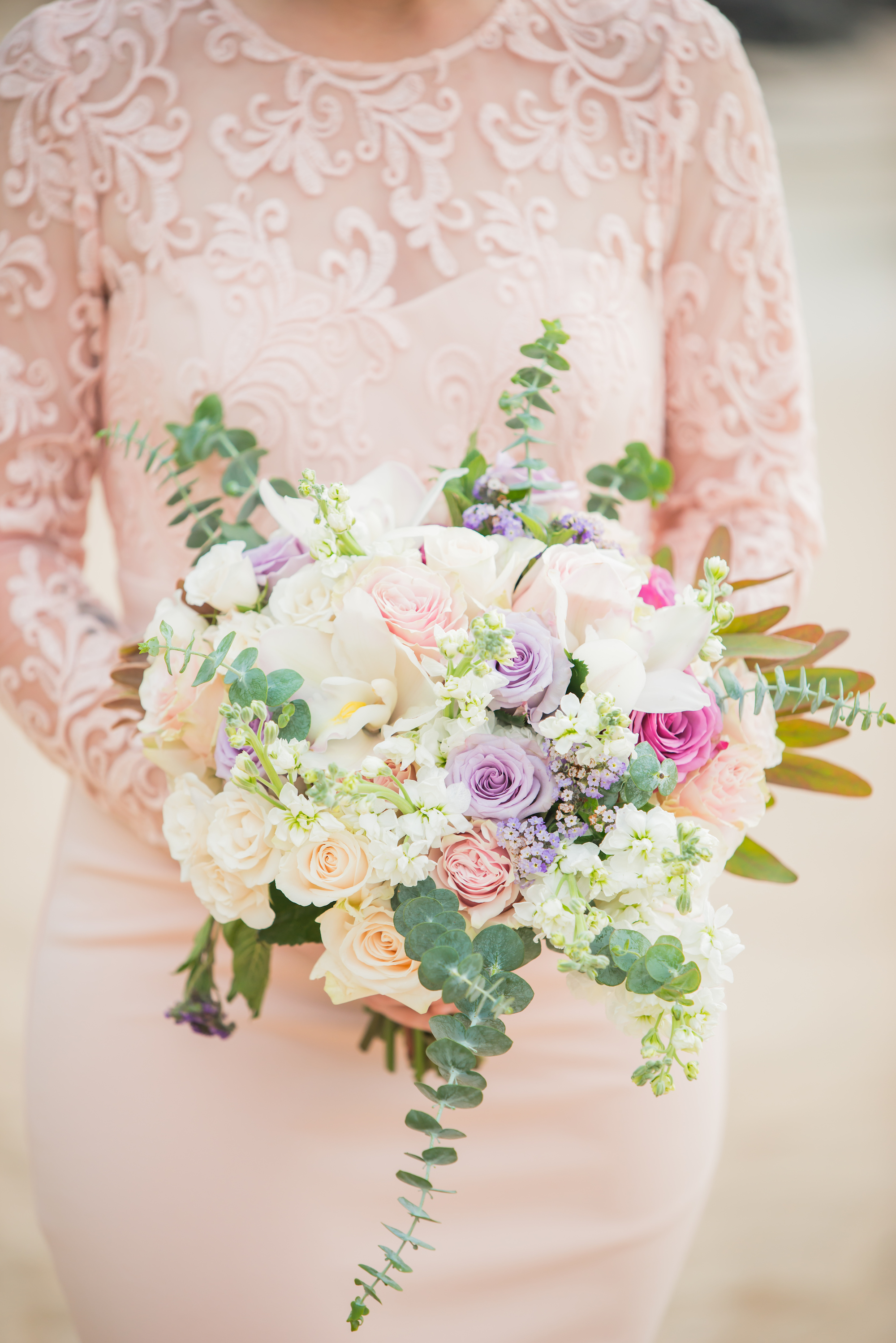
Beach wedding bouquet

The arrangement of flowers for home or building decor has a long history worldwide. The oldest evidence of formal arranging of bouquets in vases comes from ancient Egypt, and depictions of flower arrangements date to the Old Kingdom (~2500 BCE). The sacred lotus, as were herbs, palms, irises, anemones, and narcissus, were often used.

In some cultures, ancient practises still survive today; for example, in ikebana, the art of flower-arranging comes from Japan. The oldest known book on flower arranging is Japanese and dates from 1445. Simplicity and linear form are core features of ikebana, which has had a significant influence on Western flower arranging since the late 19th century

Flower arranging as an art form was brought to Japan by Buddhist monks who learned it while in China. In ancient China, flower arranging developed into a highly refined art form based on the principle that life is sacred, including the life of plants. Therefore, cut flowers were used sparingly in carefully planned arrangements. Flowers were a traditional ritual offering among Buddhists, however, and remain so.

In Europe, flower arranging as a formal art was first documented among the Dutch, who "in particular, painted wonderful informal arrangements of flowers. In the 18th century, arrangements were used to decorate the houses of the wealthy families and the aristocracy."

Flower symbolism is common in many cultures and can be complex. In China, certain flowers symbolize seasons: white plum blossoms represent winter, peach and cherry blossoms represent spring, lotus represent summer, and chrysanthemums the fall.

== Nosegay ==
The term "tussie-mussie" is sometimes used interchangeably with nosegay. A nosegay was also known as a "talking bouquet" or "flower poesy" during the Victorian era when they became a popular gift. Traditionally, brides will also carry a small nosegay. Tussie mussies were introduced to England in the early 18th century and were a fashionable accessory for young women by the early 19th century. A tussie mussie is a small circular bouquet like a nosegay but carries symbolic meaning based upon the language of flowers, where particular flowers represent specific sentiments. They were commonly exchanged by lovers, who sent messages to one another based on the flowers used in the bouquet. Traditionally, tussie mussies are arranged in a cone- or cornucopia-shaped container made of tin or silver, with a chain attached for carrying the bouquet.

== Language of flowers ==
Flower symbolism originated in Asia and the Middle East, where certain flowers, such as the lotus, were considered sacred or at least to be associated with spiritual themes. This was often reflected in artwork, for example, the use of bamboo in Chinese art to represent longevity and eternity. The language of flowers was introduced to England in the early 18th century by Mary Wortley, Lady Montague, whose husband was Ambassador to Turkey. By the Victorian era, almost every flower had a specific meaning. Small nosegay or "tussie mussie" bouquets might include chamomile flowers, which a woman might send to a romantic interest to tell him "Patience"; goldenrod represented indecision.

== Utilization ==
- The earliest recorded use of fresh flowers is as funeral paraphernalia and funerary ornaments.
- In ancient times, women adorned themselves with floral wreaths for special holidays.
- Bridal bouquets have been known since the Renaissance; originally the strongly scented flowers served the practical purpose of masking body odors and the heavy fragrance of incense; today, bouquets of flowers are worn by women at numerous celebratory occasions such as weddings, communion or confirmation, and graduation parties.
- The custom of giving a woman a bouquet on her lapel when asked to a ball dates back to Victorian times.
- As a gift, the bouquet has been popular from Baroque times to the present day.

The creation of bouquets is now known as floristry (craft) and dates back to various traditional and cultural developments. Thus, a bouquet of flowers is a common symbol with different meanings.

== Material used ==
Material is evaluated according to its potential use and the price at which it was purchased. From an aesthetic point of view it is possible to evaluate color, texture, shape, form, texture, line, as well as quality, picturesqueness and fashion. Arranging material is used to give materials the highest aesthetic and economic value.

Plants with large space requirements in a bouquet or plants that dominate a bouquet usually have large, valuable flowers and tough, leathery or lush exotic foliage: Eremurus, kala, Protea, orchids, Gloriosa, cycas and the like. For example, commonly used plants with less value and pretension are roses, gerberas, sunflowers, freesias, cheap types of orchids or tulips. Their aesthetic value and price are defined as a cheaper material.

== Wedding bouquets ==
Traditionally, the bride holds the bouquet, and the maid of honor holds it during the ceremony. After the wedding, the bride tosses it over her shoulder, and it is believed that whoever catches the bouquet will be the next to be married. This practice may have been influenced by weddings of the Roman Empire in which the bride tossed a torch to the bystanders. Additionally, it may be related to the Greek myth of the Apple of Discord.

=== Wedding bouquet shapes ===
There are many different bridal bouquet styles from which to select. Brides typically choose the shape of their bouquets according to popular trends at the time of their wedding; however, some choose bouquets which evoke another period. While the language of flowers can contribute to a message about the couple, the shapes are a personal preference.

The Posy bouquet is typically round and is thought of as modern due to the small size and relative simplicity of the arrangement. It is also popular for the ease of carrying and passing off during the ceremony. It can be composed of an expensive flower, such as a rose, or a sampling of country flowers.

The Cascading bouquet is usually a large arrangement which tapers near the bottom. It was popularized as the arrangement of choice for the 1980s at the wedding of Lady Diana Spencer and the Prince of Wales at Westminster Abbey. It can, and is often, made up of many kind of flowers and is enhanced with Baby's Breath and different types of greenery, such as ivy. This bouquet became less popular as bridal trends shifted towards simplicity; however, it has found a resurgence in recent years.

The Presentation bouquet grew in popularity at the turn of the twentieth century. It is most frequently composed of a long-stemmed bud, such as the Calla Lily, and is cradled in the bride's arms rather than carried by the stems.

There is a new trend of Ramo Buchon for bridal bouquets. Ramo Buchon is a rose bouquet that is dome-shaped, tightly packed, decorated, and wrapped in fancy paper.

The following gallery shows popular bride's bouquet shapes, including cascading, hand-tied, nosegay, pomander, flower spray and Biedermeier.

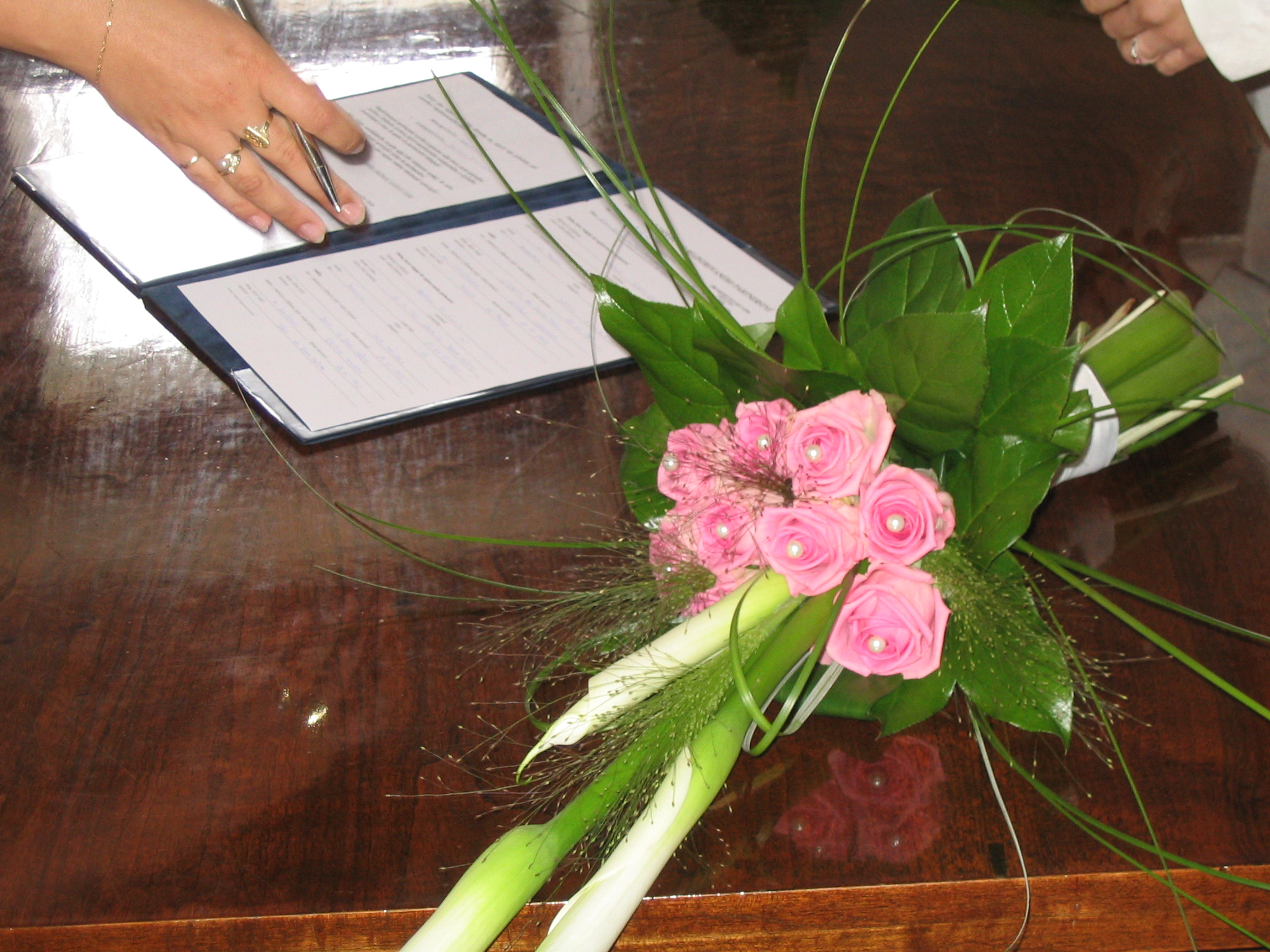
A modern arrangement.

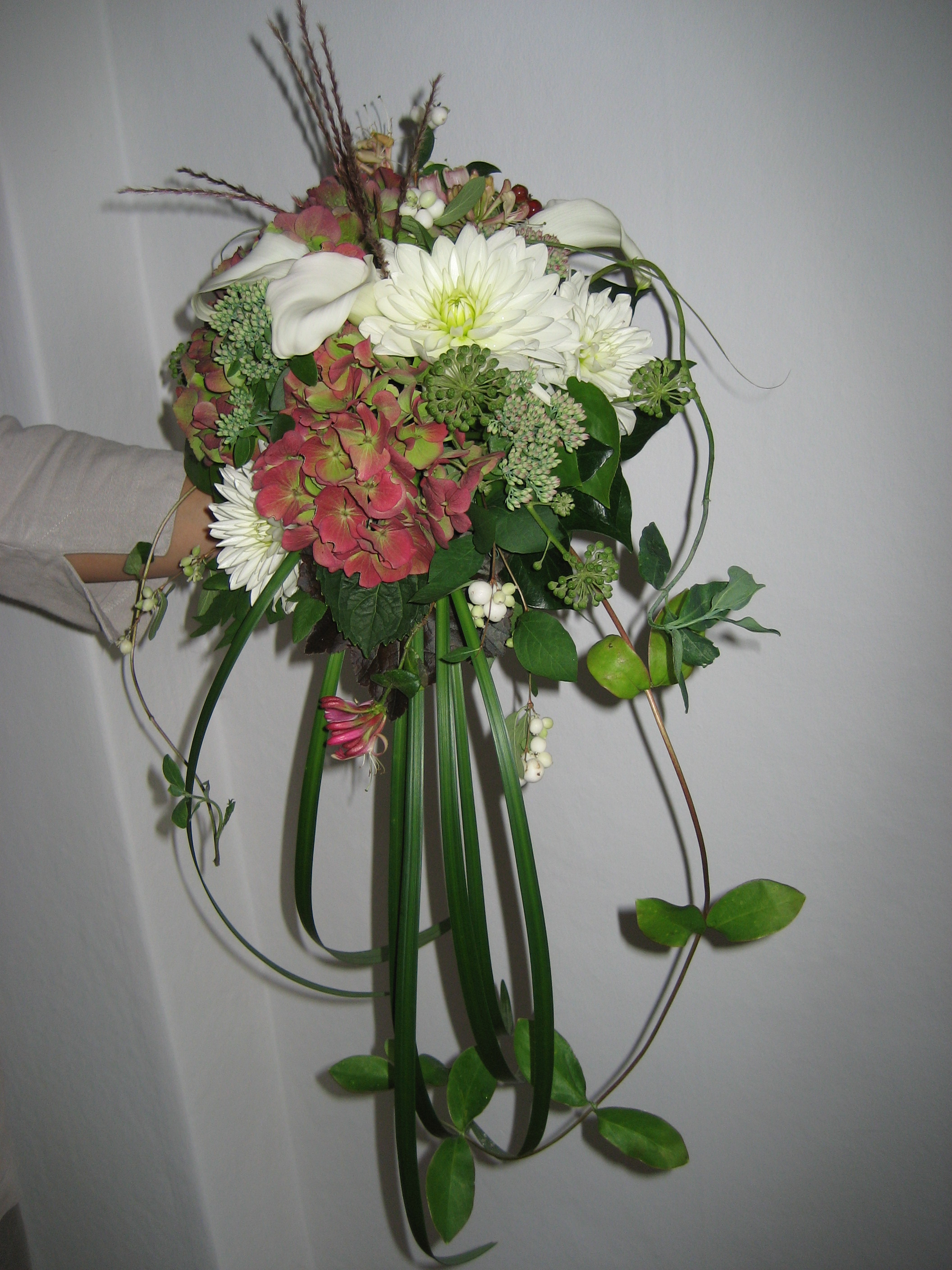
A cascading bouquet shape, with long-stemmed flowers trailing down from the main bouquet.

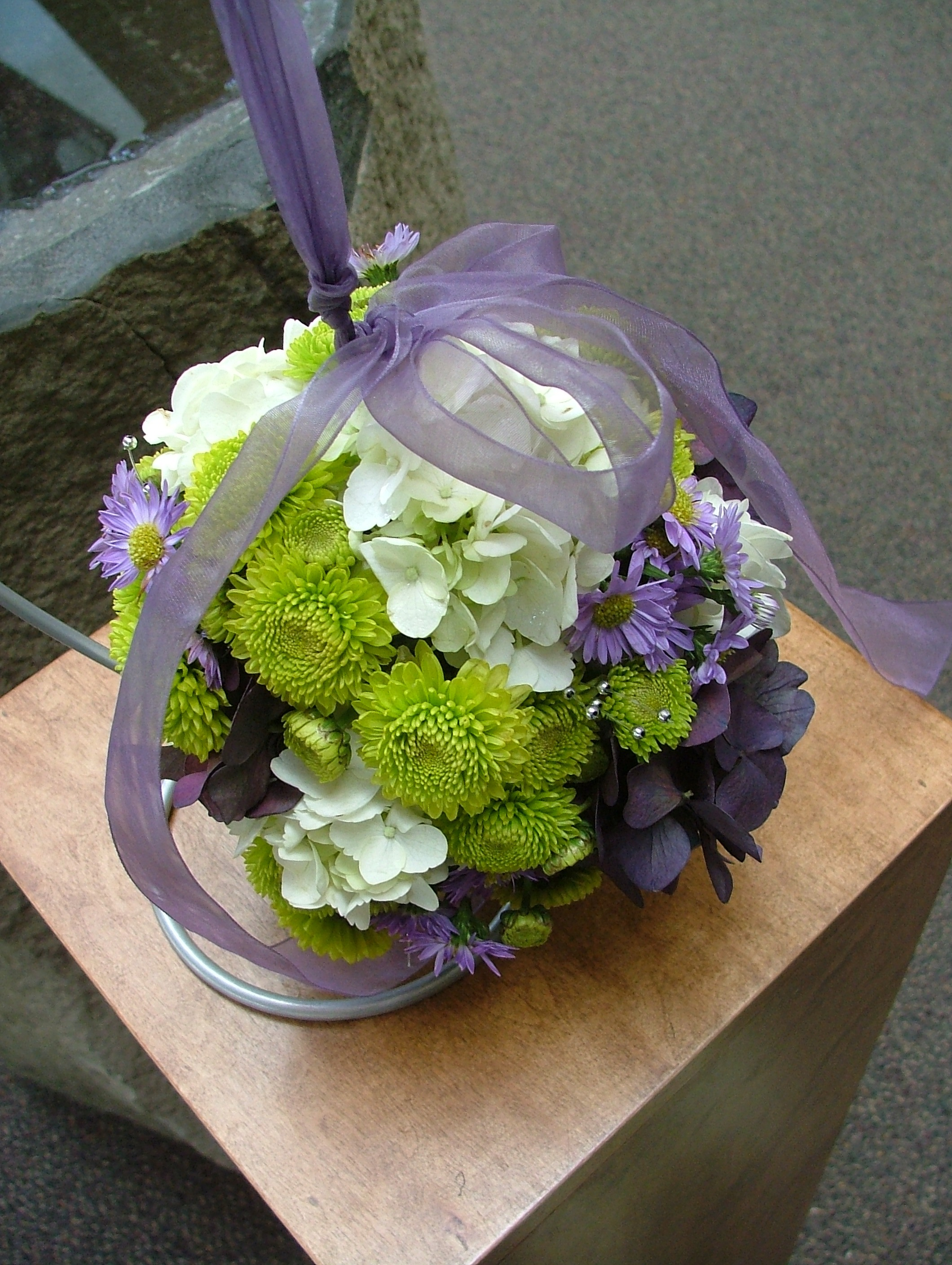
A pomander bouquet, shaped completely round and worn by a ribbon on the wrist.

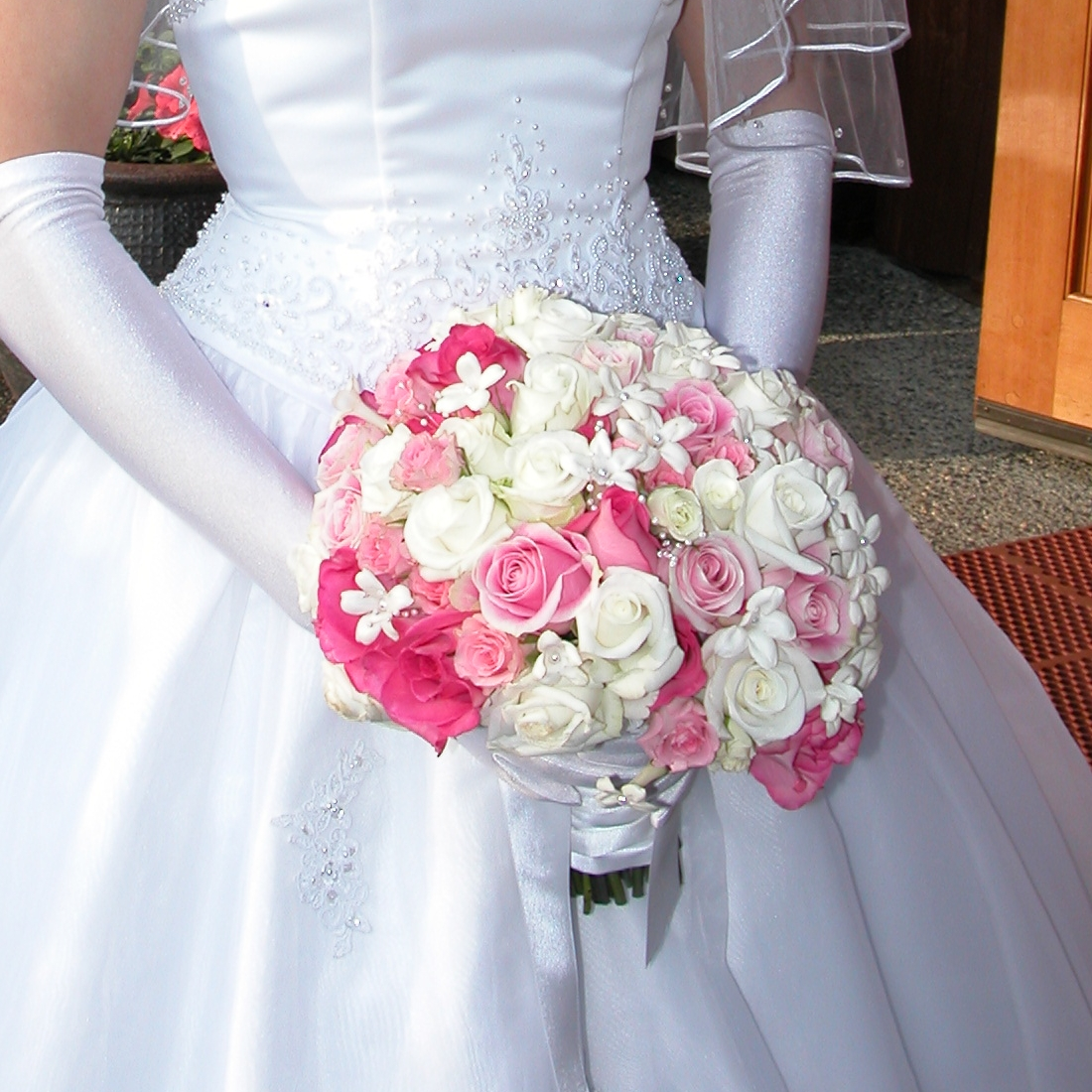
A nosegay bouquet, a round shape and roughly a foot in diameter.

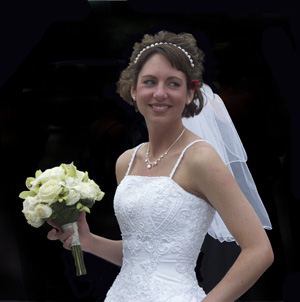
A bride holding a hand-tied bouquet, consisting of long-stemmed flowers.

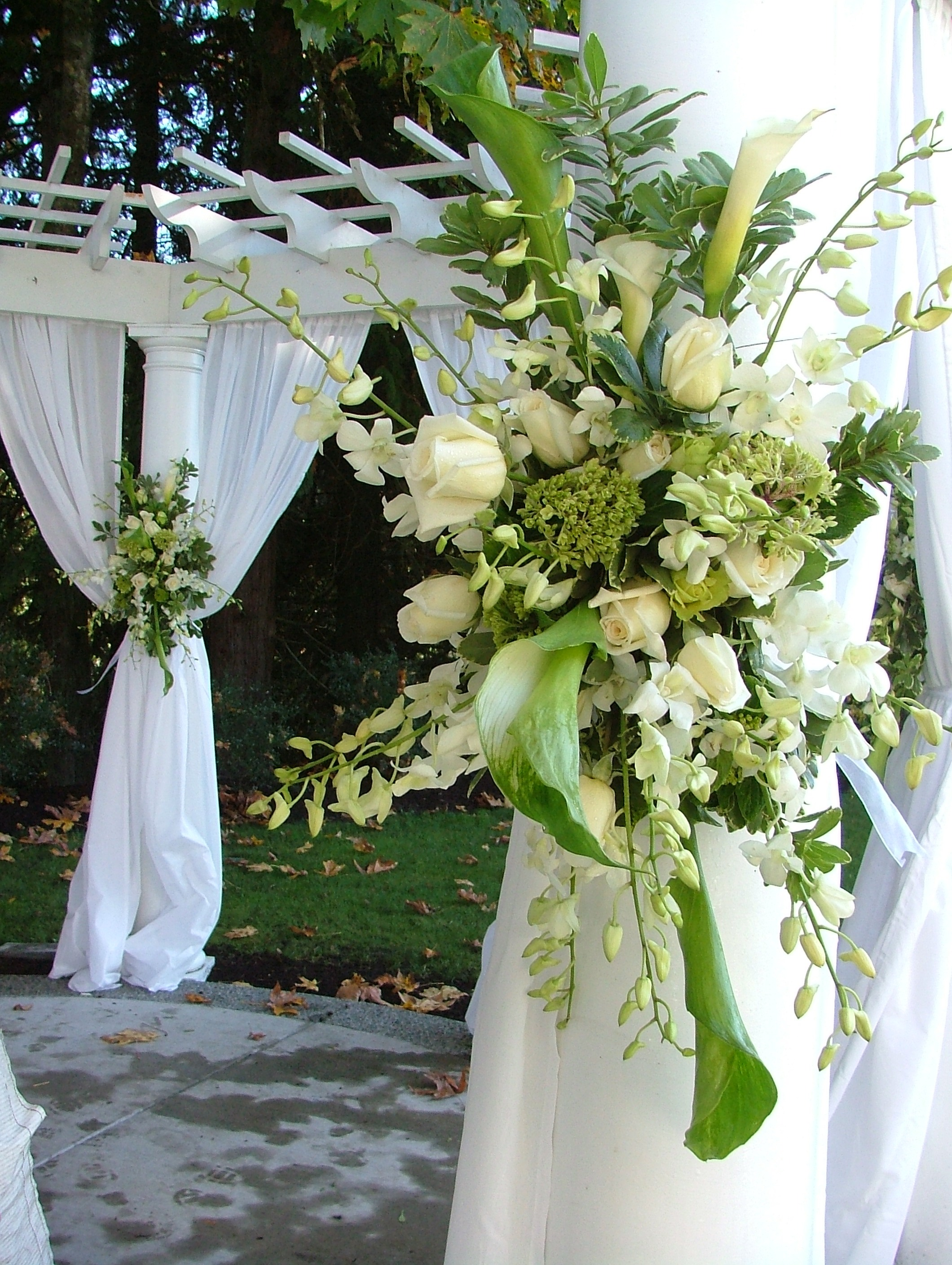
A "flower spray" bouquet attached as decor to a pillar.

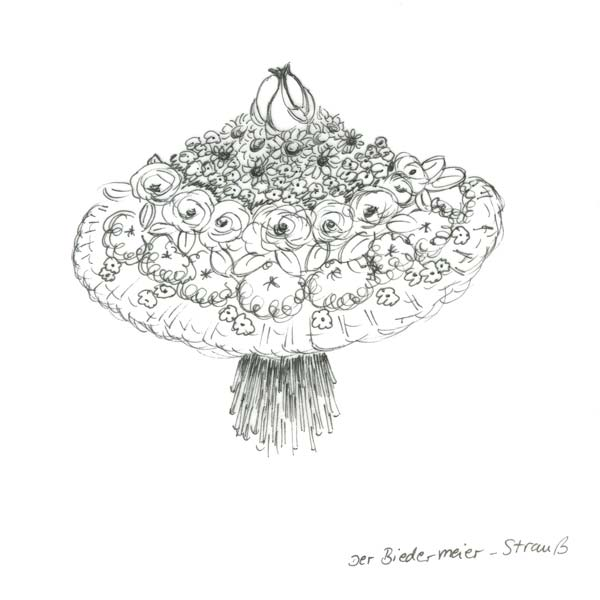
A sketch of a Biedermeier-style bouquet, with concentric rings of flower types and colours.

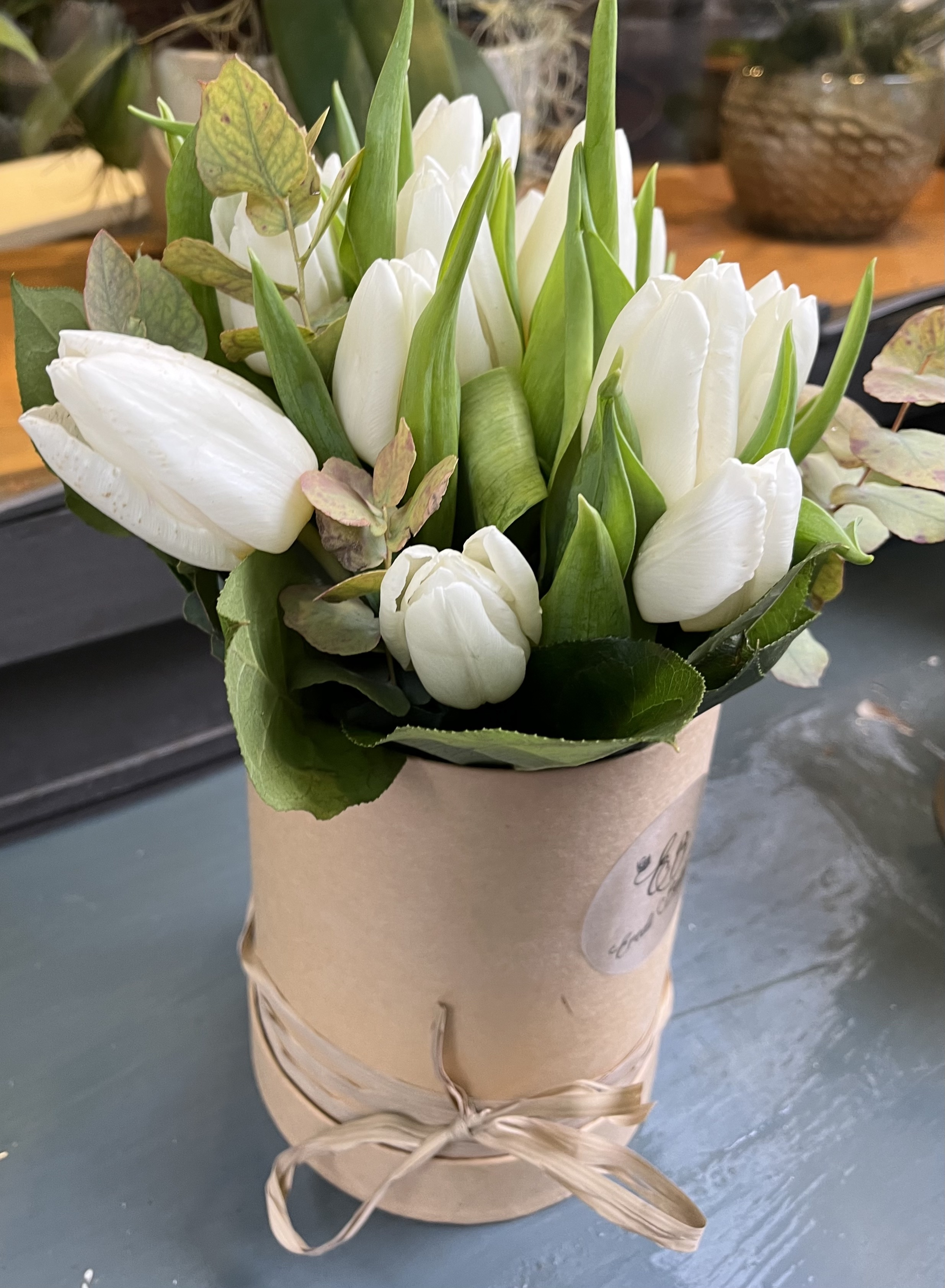
White tulips

== See also ==
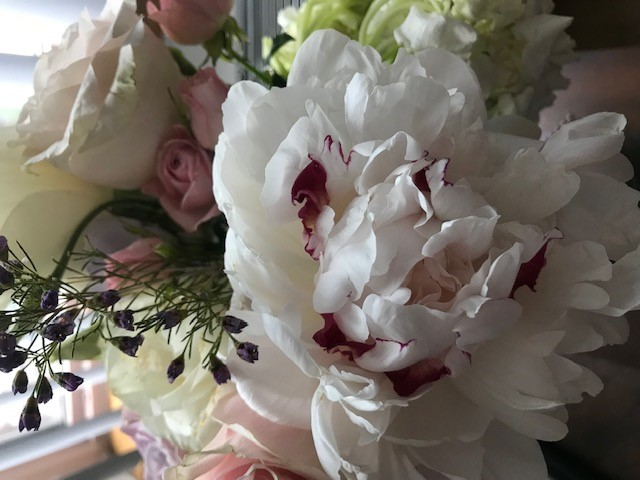

- Floral design
- Boutonnière
- Corsage
- Festoon
- Garland
- Wreath
- Vegetable bouquet
