= Nosegay =

Small flower bouquet tied at the base

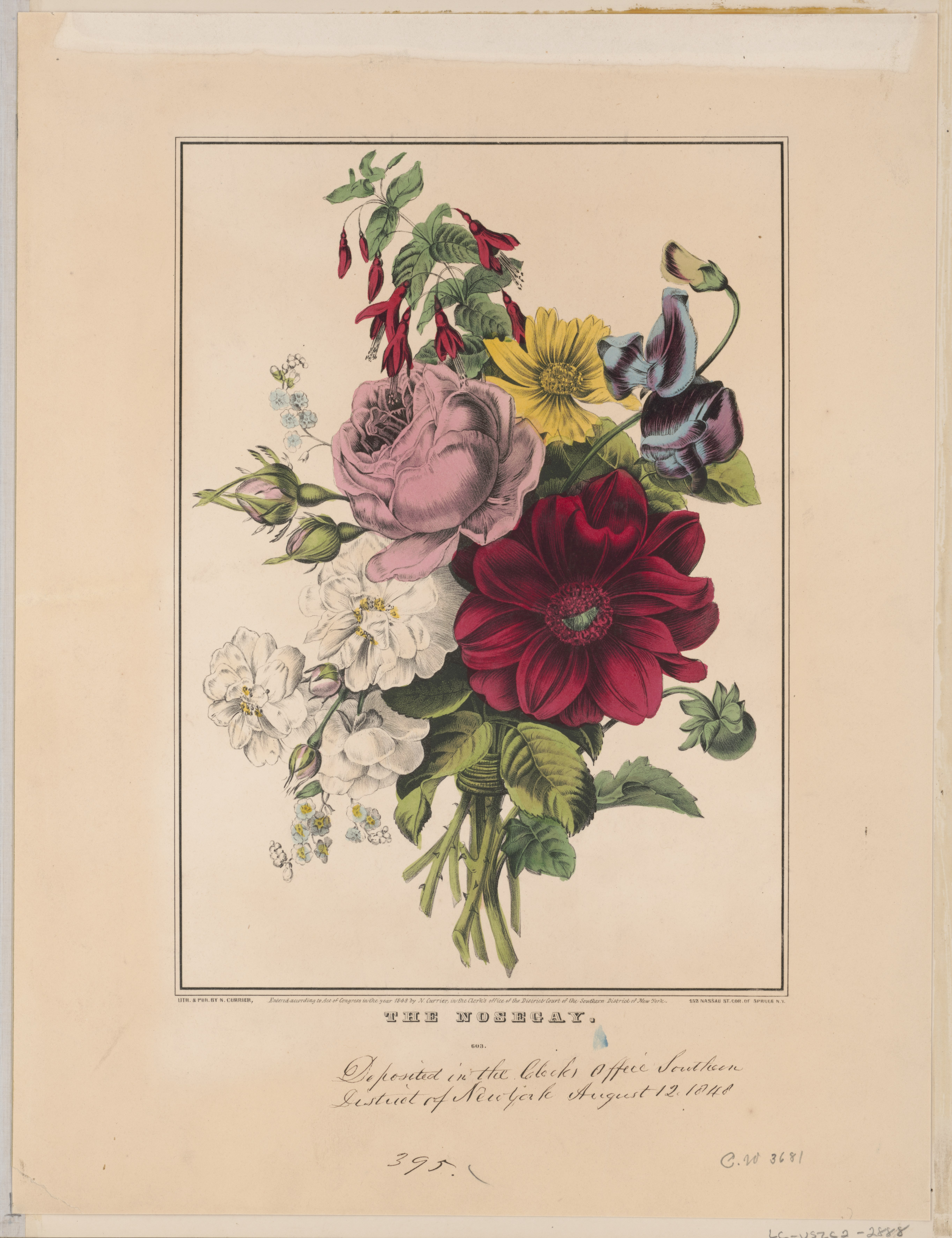
1848 illustration of a nosegay by Currier and Ives

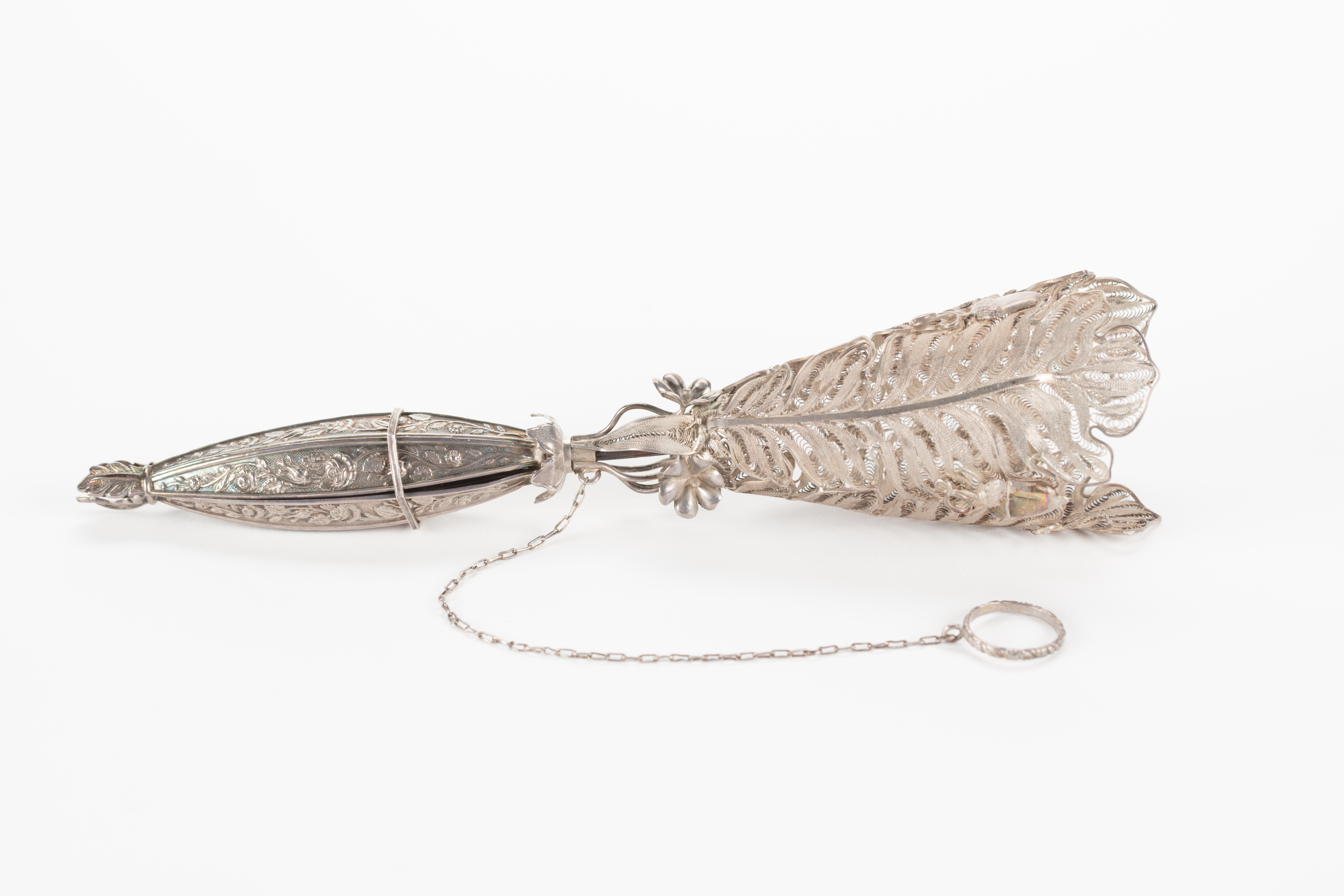
Bouquet holder

A nosegay, posy, or tussie-mussie is a small flower bouquet. They have existed in some form since at least medieval times, when they were carried or worn around the head or bodice. Doilies are traditionally used to bind the stems in these arrangements. Alternatively, "posy holders", available in a variety of shapes and materials (although often silver), enable the wearing of these arrangements "at the waist, in the hair, or secured with a brooch".

The term nosegay arose in fifteenth century Middle English as a combination of nose and gay (the latter then meaning "ornament"). A nosegay is, thus, an ornament that appeals to the nose or nostril.

The term tussie-mussie (also tussy-mussy) comes from the reign of Queen Victoria (1837–1901), when the small bouquets became a popular fashion accessory. Typically, tussie-mussies include floral symbolism from the language of flowers and therefore may be used to send a message to the recipient. In modern times, the term specifically refers to small bouquets in a conical metal holder, or the holder itself, particularly when used at a white wedding.

In the 18th century and earlier, tussie-mussies were often carried to ward off foul odors, or miasmas, as it was believed that the pleasant scents of flowers and herbs promoted well-being. Plants like lavender, rosemary, thyme, and sage were used during the plague for their disinfecting properties, as well as their strong aromas. Bouquets were often made from paper napkins or special small silver holders, but in the modern version, ribbon is used instead. Over time, tussie-mussies became more of a fashion accessory than a health necessity and might have disappeared entirely if not for a small book by Lady Mary Wortley Montagu. Her book narrated a secret code in which flowers were used to convey messages in the Turkish harem. The intrigue of receiving secret messages this way became a popular pastime.

== The language of colors ==
Floral symbolism originated in Asia and the Middle East, where certain flowers, such as the lotus, were considered sacred or at least associated with spiritual themes. This was often reflected in works of art, such as the use of bamboo in Chinese art to signify longevity and eternity. The language of flowers was introduced to England in the early 18th century by Mary Wortley, Lady Montague, whose husband was ambassador to Turkey. Small bouquets or "tussie-mussies" might include chamomile flowers, which a woman might send to a romantic interest to tell him "patience"; goldenseal represented indecision.

The meaning given to certain colors in Western culture varied - almost every flower had several associations listed in hundreds of floral dictionaries - but a consensus on the meaning of common colors emerged. Often definitions are derived from the appearance or behavior of the plant itself. For example, the mimosa, or sensitive plant, represents chastity. This is because the mimosa leaves close up at night or when touched. Similarly, the dark red rose and its thorns have been used to symbolize both the blood of Christ and the power of romantic love, while the five petals of the rose are believed to illustrate the five crucifixion wounds of Christ. Pink roses imply lesser affection, white roses imply virtue and chastity, and yellow roses imply friendship or loyalty. The black rose (in nature a very dark shade of red, purple or maroon, or can be dyed) can be associated with death and darkness because of the traditional (Western) connotations of this shade.

"The woman also had to be pretty precise about where she carried the flowers to. For example, the groom sent her a tussie-mussie (aka bouquet). If she was attaching him to her "bosom bed," it was bad news for him, as it meant friendship. Ah, but if she pinned it to her heart, 'twas an unequivocal declaration of love"". Details such as the arrangement of flowers and their buds were very important and carried different messages.

The action of giving flowers served as a tacit answer to the question. If flowers were given with the right hand, it meant the answer to the question was yes, if flowers were given with the left hand, it meant no. Important details, such as which side the bow was tied on, determined whether the message referred to the person giving the flowers or the person receiving them.

== See also ==
- Corsage
- Floral design
- Floristry
- Ring a Ring o' Roses
- Sachet
