= Vegetable bouquet =

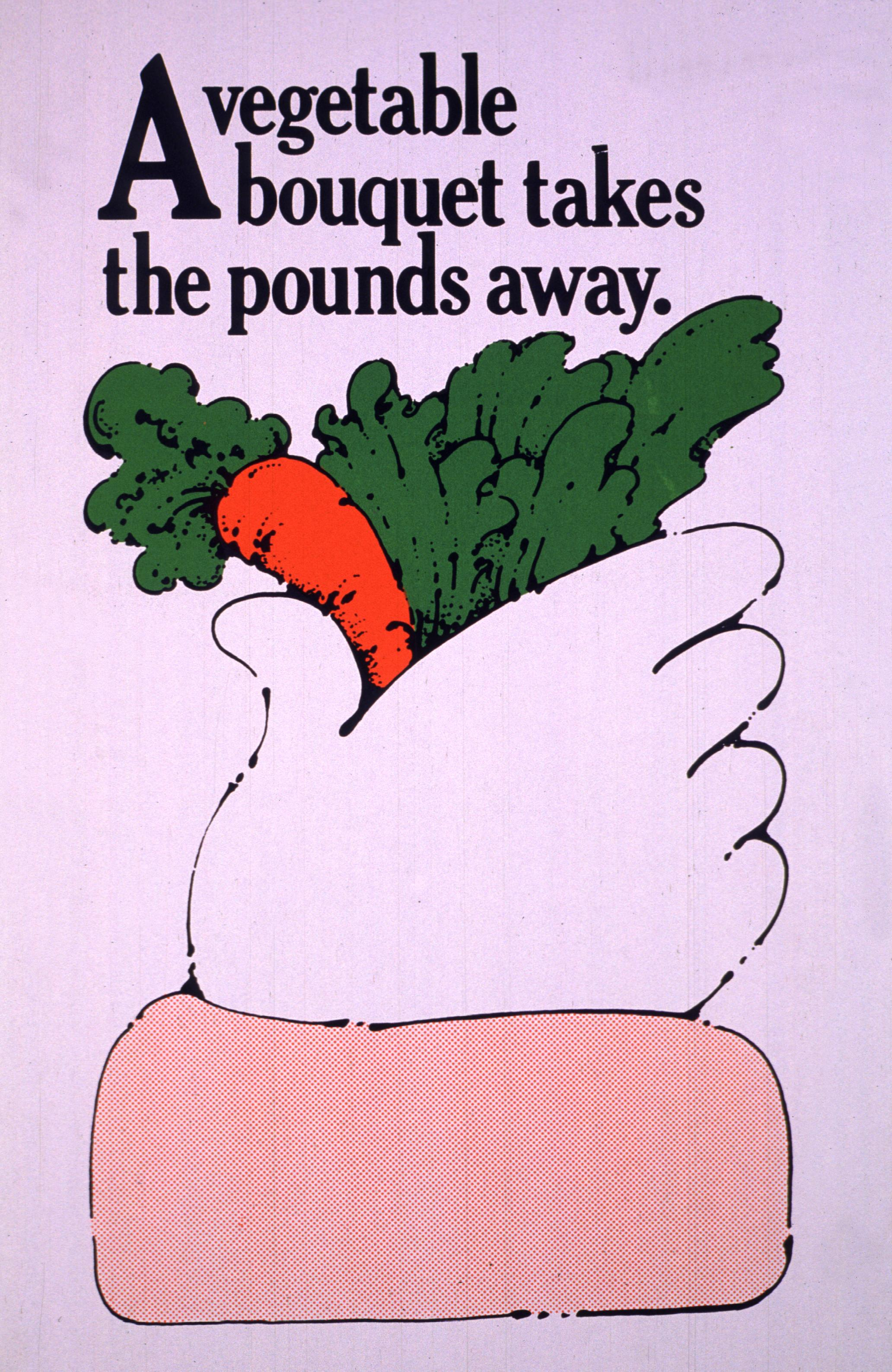
An advertisement by the U.S. National Institutes of Health

A vegetable bouquet is a collection of vegetables in a creative arrangement. Vegetable bouquets are often considered as an alternative to flower bouquets. Vegetable bouquets can be handheld or can be used for the interior decoration. They are often given as a gift for special occasions such as birthdays, anniversaries, or romantic dates. They are also occasionally used in weddings. Vegetable bouquets that contain fruit, flowers and other vegetation in addition to vegetables are commonly referred to as vegebouquets.

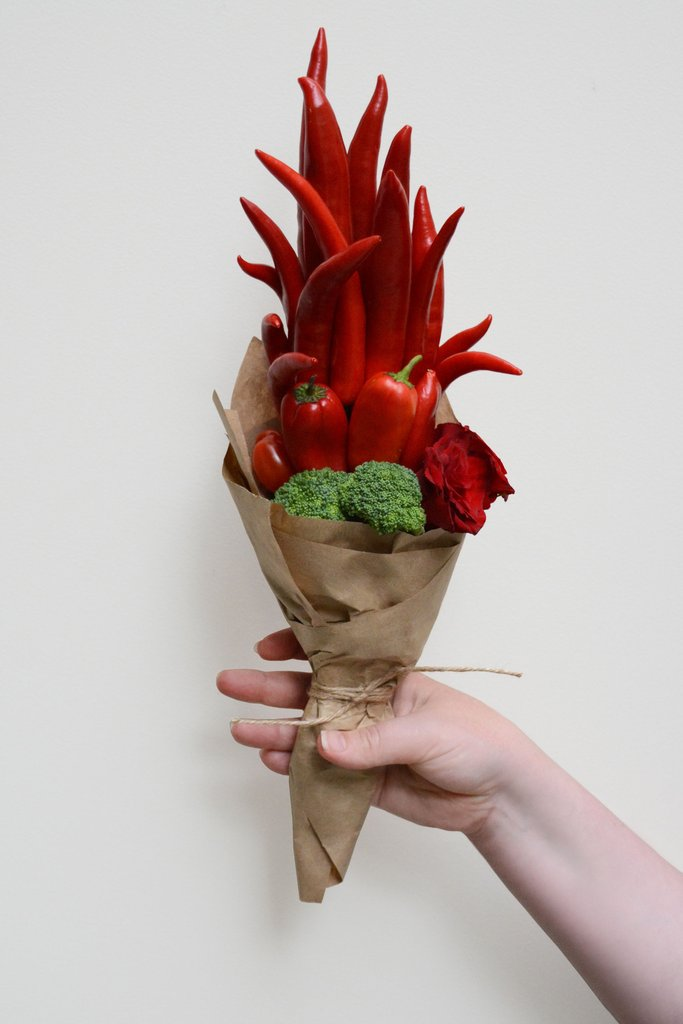
A contemporary vegetable bouquet made of chili pepper and broccoli

== History ==
The idea of creating beautiful arrangements of vegetables before consuming them is not new. For example, George Augustus Henry Sala describes a sophisticated housekeeper in 19th century London: "She would be just the person for the upper end of Sloane Street. She has a neat hand for cutting vegetable bouquets out of carrots, turnips and parsnips for garnishing."

Since the 20th century, numerous attempts have been made to use vegetable bouquets to promote a healthy lifestyle and raise the nutrition consciousness of the population.

Nowadays, the art of creating vegetable bouquets is much more accessible with numerous online courses available for vegetable bouquet designers.

== Wedding vegetable bouquets ==
In recent years, vegetable bouquets have gained some popularity as an alternative to traditional flower bouquets in weddings. Kale, broccoli, and artichokes are becoming increasingly popular in wedding vegetable bouquets.

== Comparison to flower bouquets ==
Most of the ingredients of a vegetable bouquet can be consumed after dismantling the bouquet as opposed to flower bouquets which ingredients can be either thrown away, dried, or used as a compost. Some companies offer completely zero-waste versions of vegetable bouquets so that all of the ingredients can be consumed or re-used.

Similar to flowers, vegetable bouquets can be arranged to form a wreath.

Vegetable bouquets are usually heavier than flower bouquets, which makes it difficult to handhold them for longer periods of time.
