= Corsage =

Small bouquet worn on clothing

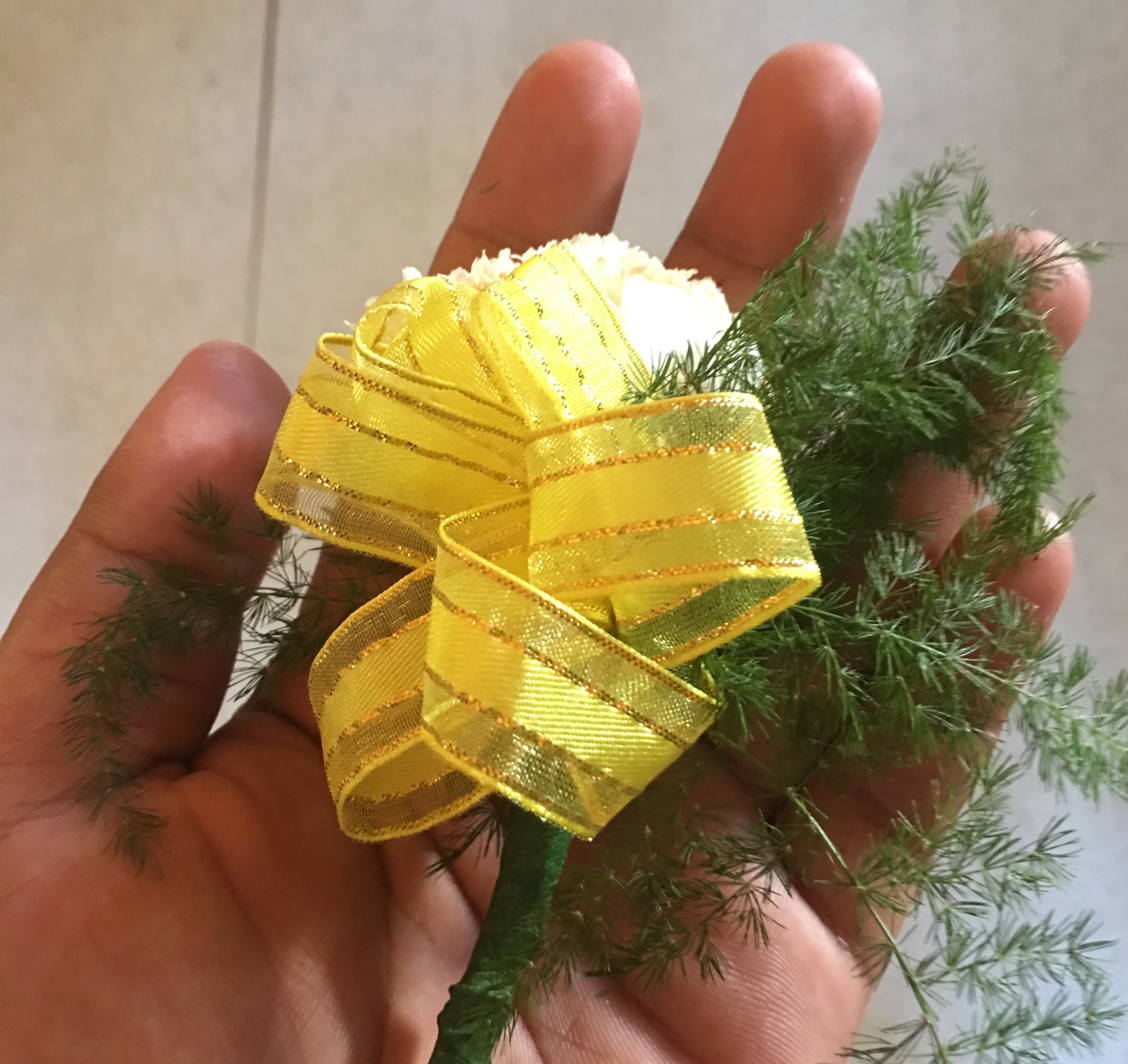
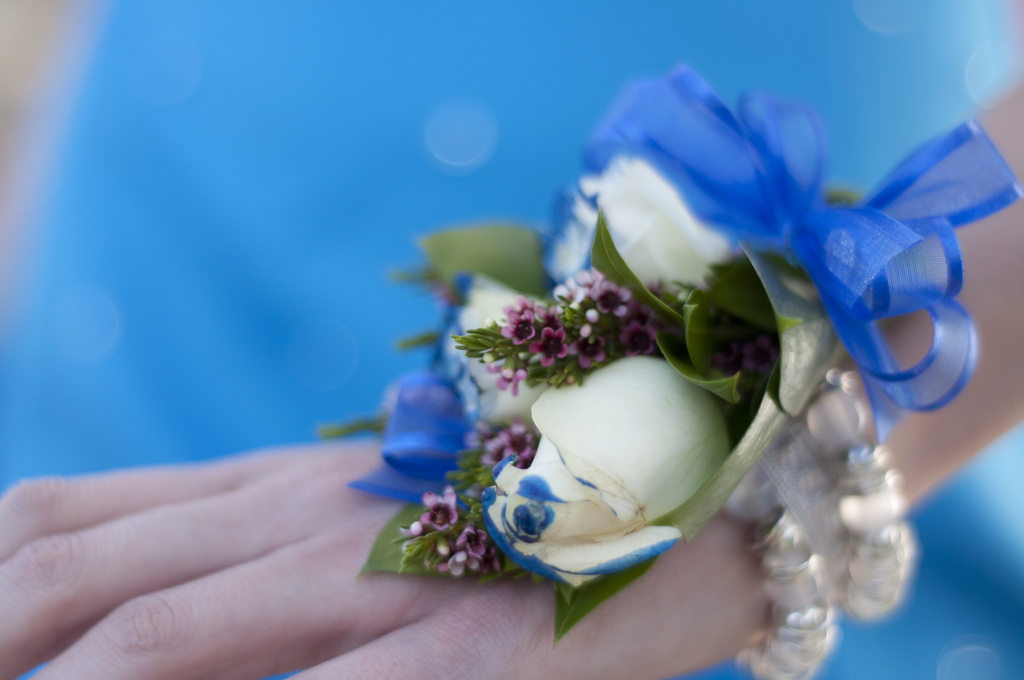
Examples of a corsage. Colors for a corsage are commonly chosen to coordinate with attire.

A corsage /kɔːrˈsɑːʒ/ is a small bouquet of flowers worn on a woman's dress or around her wrist for a formal occasion. They are typically given to her by her date. Today, corsages are most commonly seen at homecomings, proms, and similar formal events.

In some countries, similar ornaments are worn by the mothers and grandmothers of the bride and groom at a wedding ceremony.

Flowers worn by men are generally called buttonholes or boutonnières. At school events such as homecoming or prom, male-female couples generally coordinate the corsage and boutonnière, signifying their connection, and distinguishing them from others. In some cases, young girls may wear a corsage to a father-daughter dance, and the father may also wear a boutonnière.

== History ==
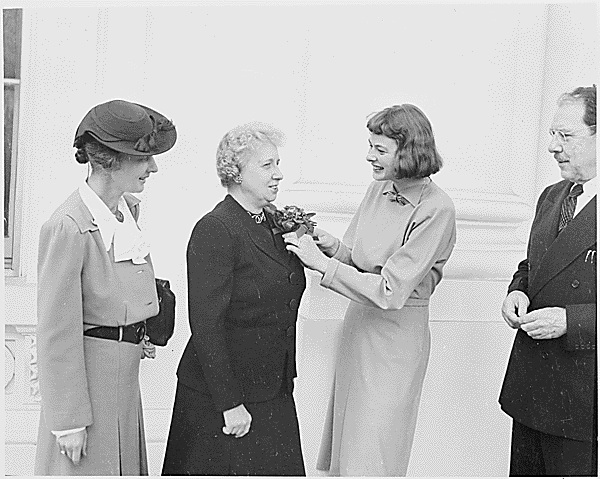
A traditional pin-on corsage

Wearing flowers pinned to clothing dates as far back as Ancient Greece, when small bunches of fragrant flowers and herbs were worn at weddings to ward off evil spirits. During the 16th and 17th centuries, corsages and boutonnières may have been a part of daily life to prevent disease and to ward off evil spirits, but over time, they became special-occasion pieces.

The word corsage comes from the French term bouquet de corsage, meaning a bouquet of flowers worn on upper part of the body ("corsage" meaning girdle, bodice in French), which was traditionally worn by women to weddings and funerals. Eventually, the term shortened to corsage in English. In the early 19th century, corsages were regarded as a courting gift and were often given at formal dances. Traditionally, the gentleman would bring a gift of flowers for his date's parents and would select one of the flowers to give to his date, which would then be carried or attached to her clothing, usually on the front of the shoulder. During the 1950s, some corsages were made with fruit and would be seen on hats for decoration. As dress styles changed, pinning the corsage to the dress became impractical, and wrist corsages became the norm.

Today's corsages are similar to those made in previous decades, though generally smaller. It is still customary for someone to give their female date a corsage when attending a formal dance, but they are also sometimes given to a daughter attending a formal event by her parents or worn by the mothers and grandmothers of the bride and groom at a wedding. Wives and any surviving mothers typically wear corsages at Anniversary celebrations; generally, the flowers are the same as what was used at the wedding, with ribbons indicating the milestone, (i.e. silver for 25th, red for 40th). Florists recommend that the flowers be complementary in color to the attire, and corsages and boutonnières should be coordinated to indicate that a couple is attending the event together. Corsages are often dried and pressed to be preserved as mementos.

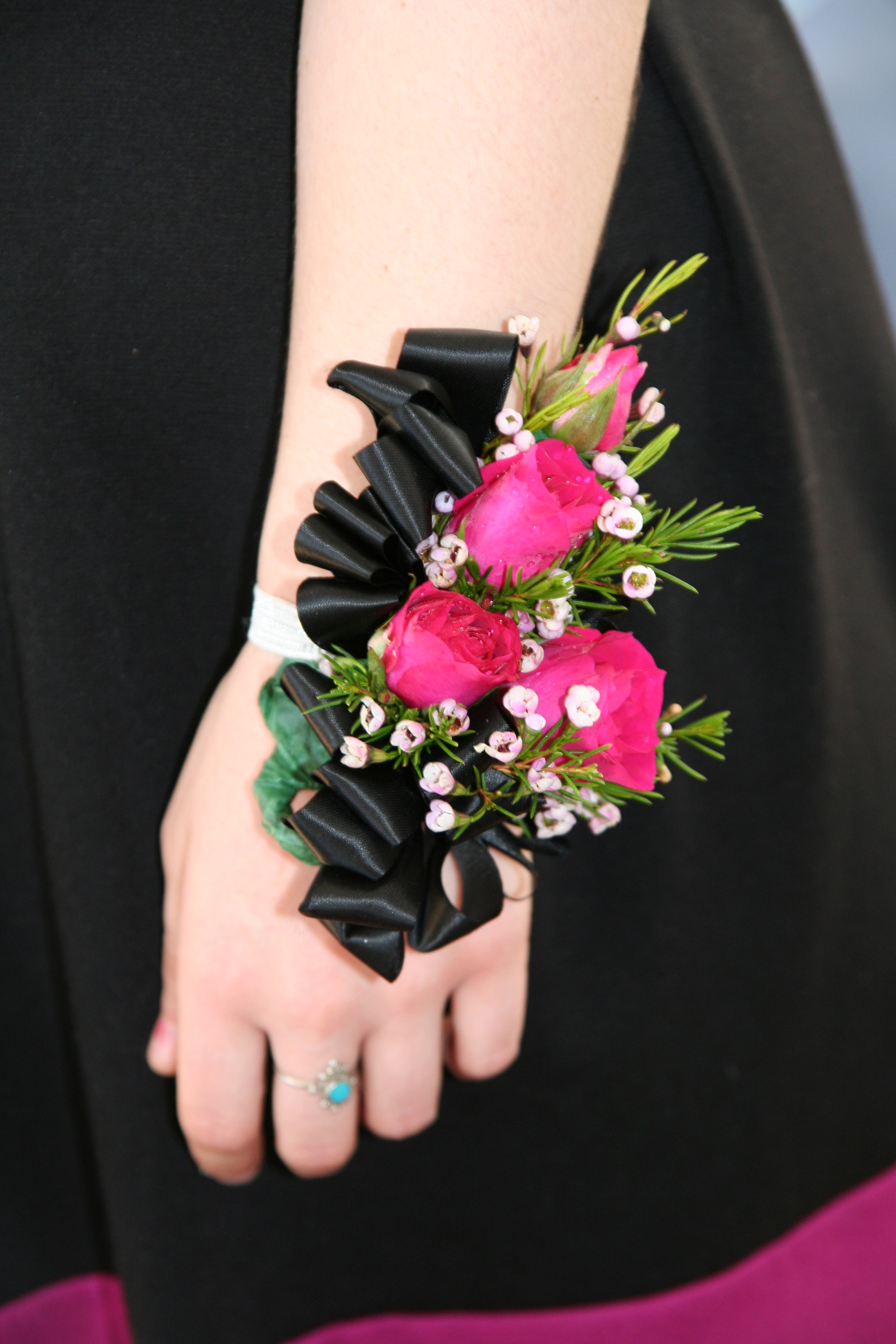
A modern wrist corsage made with black satin ribbon, pink spray roses, and wax flower

== Prom ==
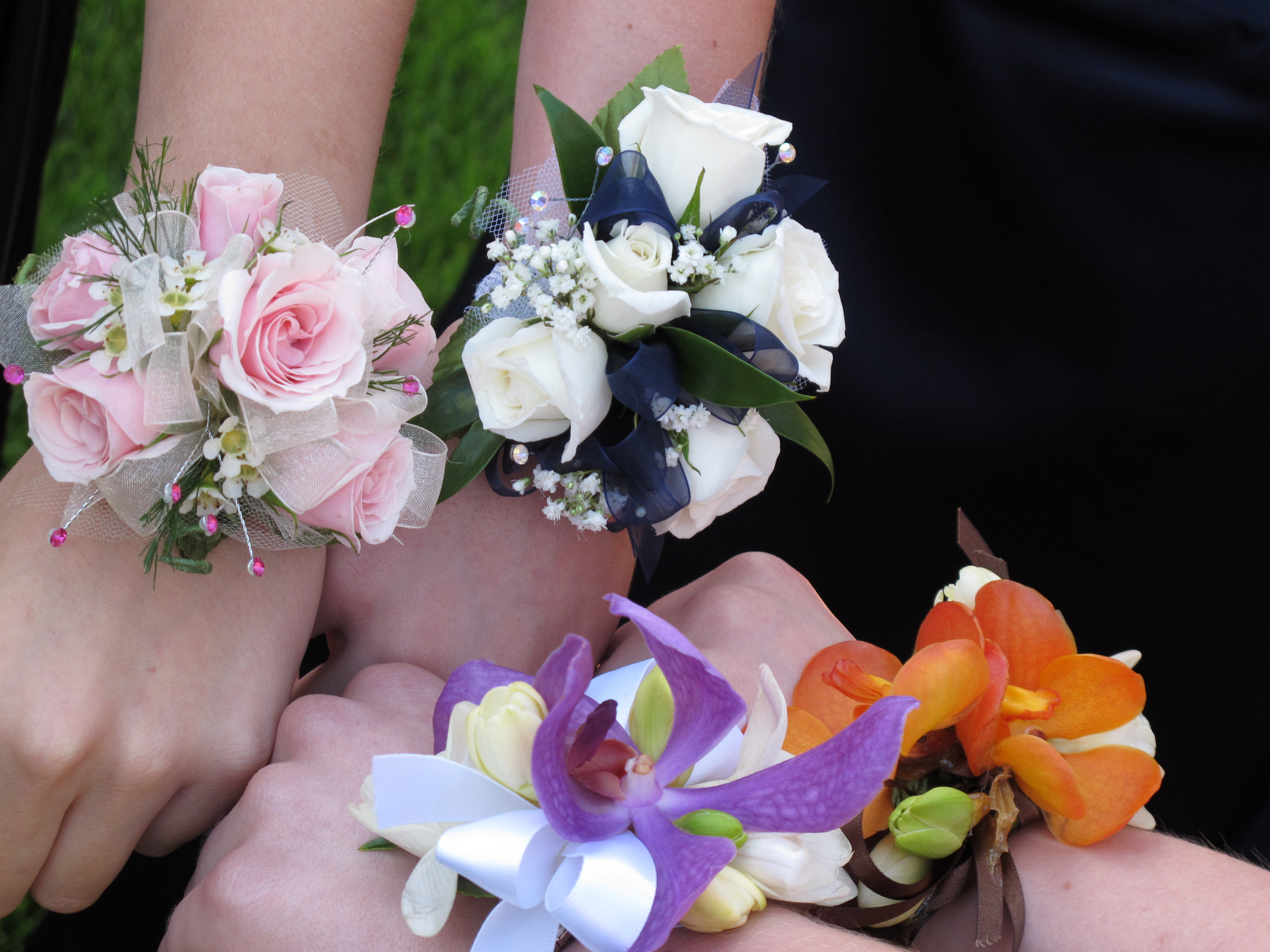
Modern wrist corsages

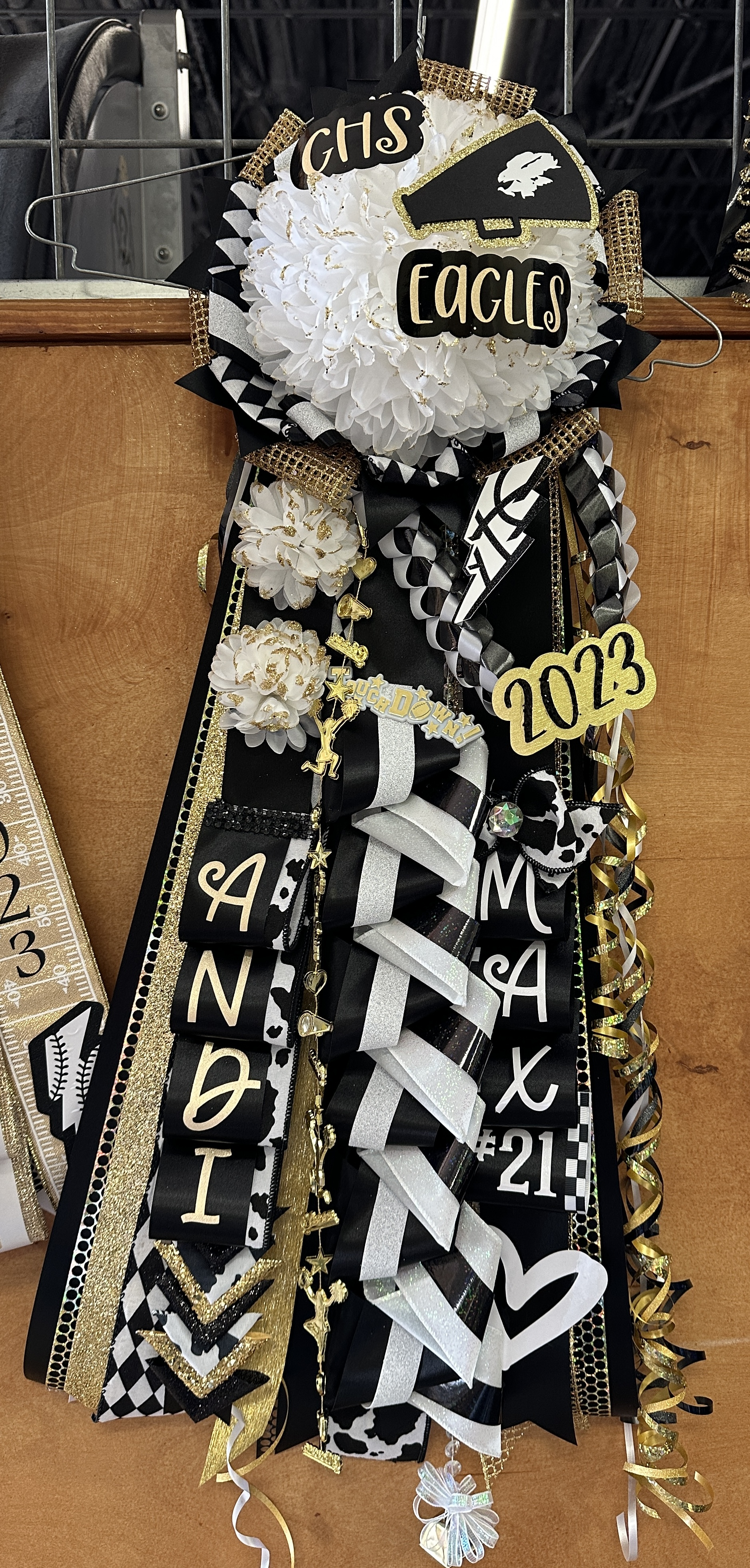
Homecoming mum

When attending a school formal or prom in the US, providing a corsage for a prom date signifies consideration and generosity, as the corsage is meant to symbolize and honor the person wearing it. Corsages are usually worn around a prom date's wrist; alternatively, they may be pinned on her dress or a modified nosegay can be carried in her hand. The colors of the flowers are usually chosen to complement the dress or to add color to the couple, creating a unifying look. Prom couples may wish to go together to choose the flowers for a custom-made corsage or boutonnière. Traditionally, the male presents a corsage or nosegay to the female as a gift, while the female would provide the boutonnière and pin it on the male's shirt or jacket.

== Homecoming ==
Given to a student by a date or parent to wear on homecoming day, homecoming chrysanthemums ("mums") are an over-100-year-old tradition in the U.S. associated with the emergence of homecoming football games at universities and colleges, especially in the South and Midwest. After World War II, it became popular for homecoming mum corsages to be adorned with ribbons in school colors to signify school spirit. Some sources identify the University of Missouri, Southwestern University, and Baylor University as the first universities to host homecoming festivities. Soon after, homecoming games and traditions spread to high schools. In these early years, the chrysanthemum was typically used as the homecoming corsage flower because of its heartiness, popularity, and seasonal availability.

Homecoming mums are primarily a high school tradition seen in Texas and adjacent states such as Oklahoma, New Mexico, and Louisiana. In Texas, they are described as rite of passage and are gifted by family, a date, or a friend. Starting in the late 1950s-early 1960s, Texas homecoming mums started evolving into more elaborate designs than those seen in the rest of the country. Ribbons got longer, trinkets (small plastic decorations) were added, and differentiation by class year slowly became the norm. Silk flowers eventually replaced live chrysanthemums once demand overcame florists' ability to supply real flowers; also, artificial flowers are able to hold up better as more decorative accoutrements are added. Meanwhile, in the rest of the country, homecoming mum design remained essentially the same but popularity slowly diminished.

Texas-style homecoming mums are considerably larger today than in past generations and typically feature numerous ribbons and additional adornments, including loops, braids, whips (basket-style woven ribbons), feather boas, personalized teddy bears, die-cuts, and various trinkets and baubles. Male students sometimes wear a more compact version known as a homecoming garter, which is fixed to the upper arm with an elastic band. Because of the availability of supplies and the large number of small businesses dedicated to mum-making, students can choose whether to purchase a ready-to-wear mum, a custom mum, or make one themselves. Some creations weigh up to ten pounds, take days to fabricate, and cost from $45-$700, depending on how elaborate they are. Seniors' mums are usually larger than those of other grade levels; at many schools, the tradition is for the senior mum to be white (rather than school colors) with accents such as gold, white, or trending colors. In many high school districts, students wear their homecoming mums and garters up to 12 hours to classes, pep rallies, and to the homecoming football game.

Arlington ISD in Texas achieved the first Guinness World Record for the largest homecoming mum, a 22-foot design for Breast Cancer Awareness Month. Now, Lewisville High School holds the Guinness World Record.

== Types ==
Corsages can be made from a single flower or a small bunch of flowers, and a variety of flowers can be used. The following table shows some of the main flowers and accents used to create a custom-made corsage and that can be included in a nosegay and boutonnière.

Main flowers	Fillers and accents	Extras
Spray roses (sweetheart roses)	Gypsophilia (baby's breath)	Artificial leaves
Standard roses	Solidago	Gems
Orchids	Wax flower	Beads
Carnations	Seeded eucalyptus	Ribbon
Mini calla lilies	Asters	Pearl wristband
Succulents	Hypericum	Bracelet
Freesia	Chamomile	Glitter
Daisies		
Homecoming Mums	Ribbons and boas	Trinkets, bells, and die cuts

== Tools ==
The style and design of a corsage may vary depending on the event. Younger generations tend to use wrist corsages, which may vary in style and size depending on the wearer. The more traditional option is a corsage pinned on the shoulder of a woman's dress. This style often gets confused with a boutonnière. The main difference is the size and the number of flowers used.

If a wrist corsage is chosen for an event, it can be made using wire and floral tape or floral glue. The wire method is recommended for pin-on corsages because the wire will support the stems or flower bulbs. Glue can be added to hold the flowers together if the wire and tape are not sufficient.

Wrist corsage	Pin-on corsage
Flowers	Flowers
Floral glue	Floral wire
Floral tape	Floral tape
Floral wire	

== See also ==
- Floristry
