= Cut flowers =

Flowers or buds harvested for decoration

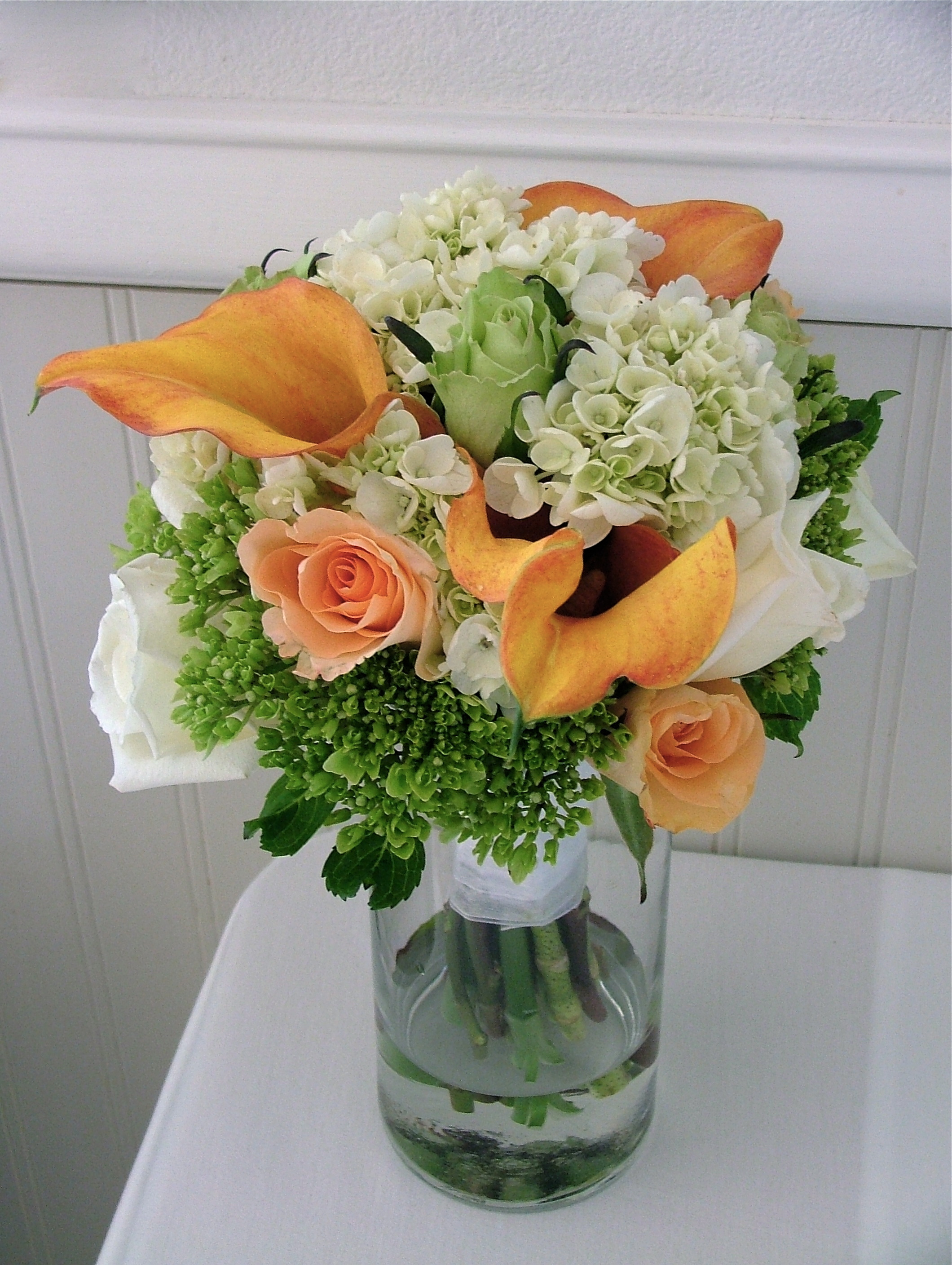
Rose, hydrangea and calla wedding bouquet

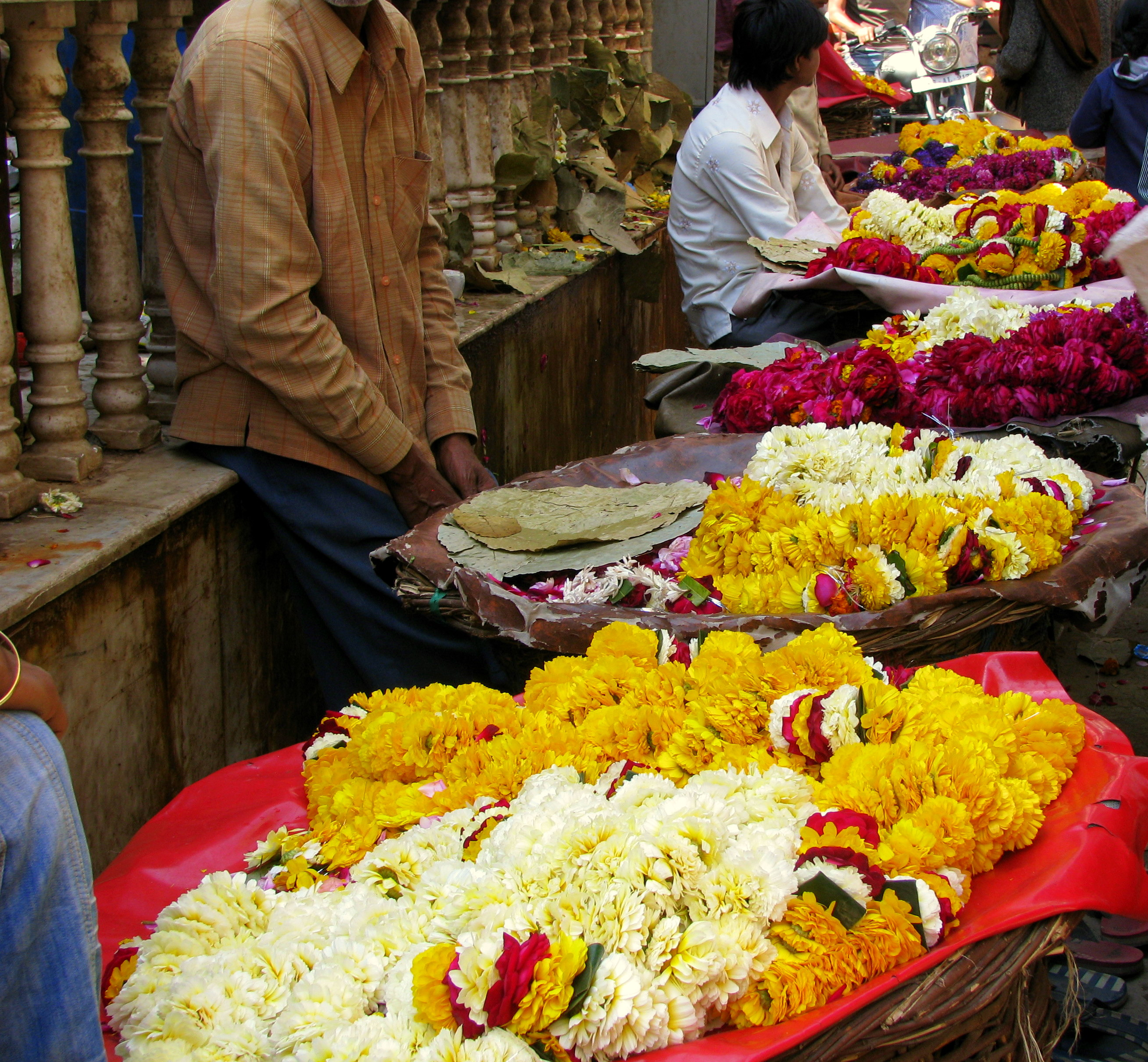
Garland sellers outside Banke Bihari Temple, Vrindavan, India

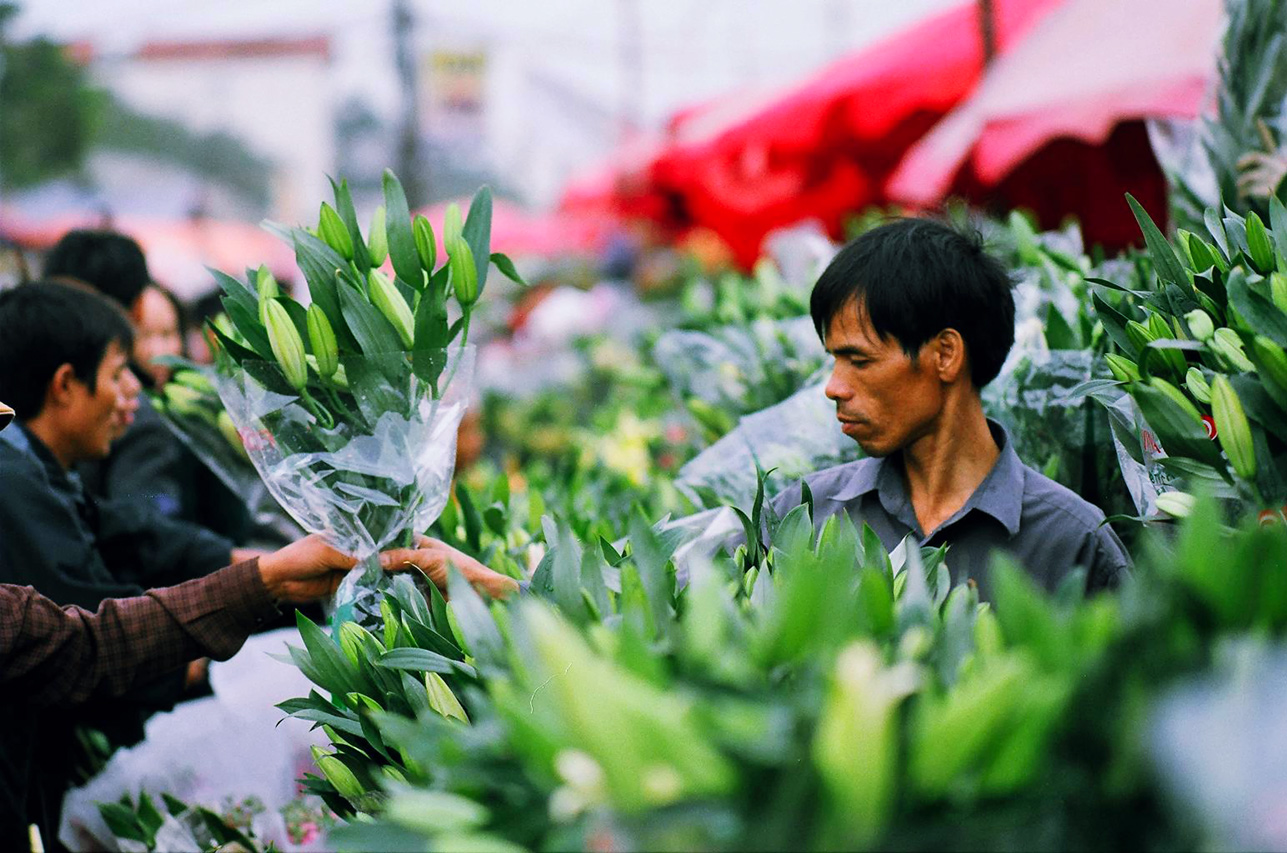
A flower market in Vietnam

Cut flowers are flowers and flower buds (often with some stem and leaf) that have been cut from the plant bearing them. They are removed from the plant for decorative use. Cut greens are leaves with or without stems added to the cut flowers for contrast and design purposes.

Floral design professionals work at florist shops (floristry) and use their design skills and experience with many types of flowers and greens to create works of art with flowers.

Cut flowers, and to a lesser extent, cut greens, are a significant and international segment of the floral industry. The plants that are grown vary by plant species as well as by climate, cultural practices and the accessibility of worldwide transportation. Professional horticulturists raise the plants specifically for this purpose, in field or glasshouse growing conditions. Boxes of harvested flowers are shipped via air freight throughout the world.

The study of the efficient production, distribution and marketing of floral crops is a branch of horticulture, called floriculture.

== Uses ==
Flowers brighten and enhance the human environment. Cut flowers and flower arrangements with cut greens bring the outdoors indoors. Many home gardeners harvest flowers from their own gardens, to increase their everyday enjoyment. Garden cut flowers are also used to enhance gatherings of family and friends. These are often enhanced with the addition foliage from other plants.

In some cultures, a major use of cut flowers is for worship; this can be seen especially in south and southeast Asia.

Sometimes the flowers are picked rather than cut, without any significant leaf or stem. Such flowers may be used for wearing in hair, or in a button-hole. Masses of flowers may be used for sprinkling, in a similar way to confetti.

Garlands, wreaths and bouquets are major value added products in many markets.

It is common for cut flowers and cut greens to be placed in a vase. Common uses are informal and formal bouquets in a glass vase for hospital visits, wedding bouquets, wedding arrangements, funeral casket displays, large arrangements in hotel lobbies and party venues, boutonnieres, wreaths, and garlands. Cut flowers are used at flower shows at garden clubs throughout the world and flower competitions at county and state fairs in the US. Cut flowers are a common gift for family or friends or just a day brightener on a work station or kitchen table.

== Cut flowers and cut greens ==
Plants used for cut flowers and cut greens are derived from many plant species and diverse plant families. Cut flower arrangements can include cut stems from annual plants, flower bulbs or herbaceous perennials, cut stems of evergreens or colored leaves, flowers from landscape shrubs, flowers that have been dried or preserved, fruit on tree branches, dried uniquely shaped fruit or stems from plants, unique dried weeds (sometimes painted to add a distinctive touch), etc. These plants come from diverse natural habitats, so different environmental conditions are used to grow them. The cut flower plants that were first used in the development of the floral industry in northern Europe were those adapted to the cool temperatures that occur there. On the other hand, the warmer temperatures of Southeast Asia, led to the development of different plants adapted to those conditions.

The floral industry was primarily local, wherever in the world, until the 1950s. The advent and development of international trade and transportation changed the cut flower segment of the floral industry. Cut flowers could be grown cheaply in a cool or warm region of the world and shipped to markets in population centers anywhere. This started in the cool coastal regions of California but quickly expanded into the mountains of Colombia, Ecuador, Kenya, Ethiopia, China, Mexico, etc., and to distinctive environments in Indonesia, South Africa, Hawaii, Australia, New Zealand, etc. In many of these countries, flower farmers could choose a location for year-round plant production based on the altitude, cooler crops higher in the mountains, warmer crops at lower altitudes and offer work and income to the local population. This led to an increase in the taxa used as cut flowers across the world.

=== Cool temperature plants ===
These plants prefer to grow at temperatures of 10 °C (50 °F) to 18 °C (65 °F)

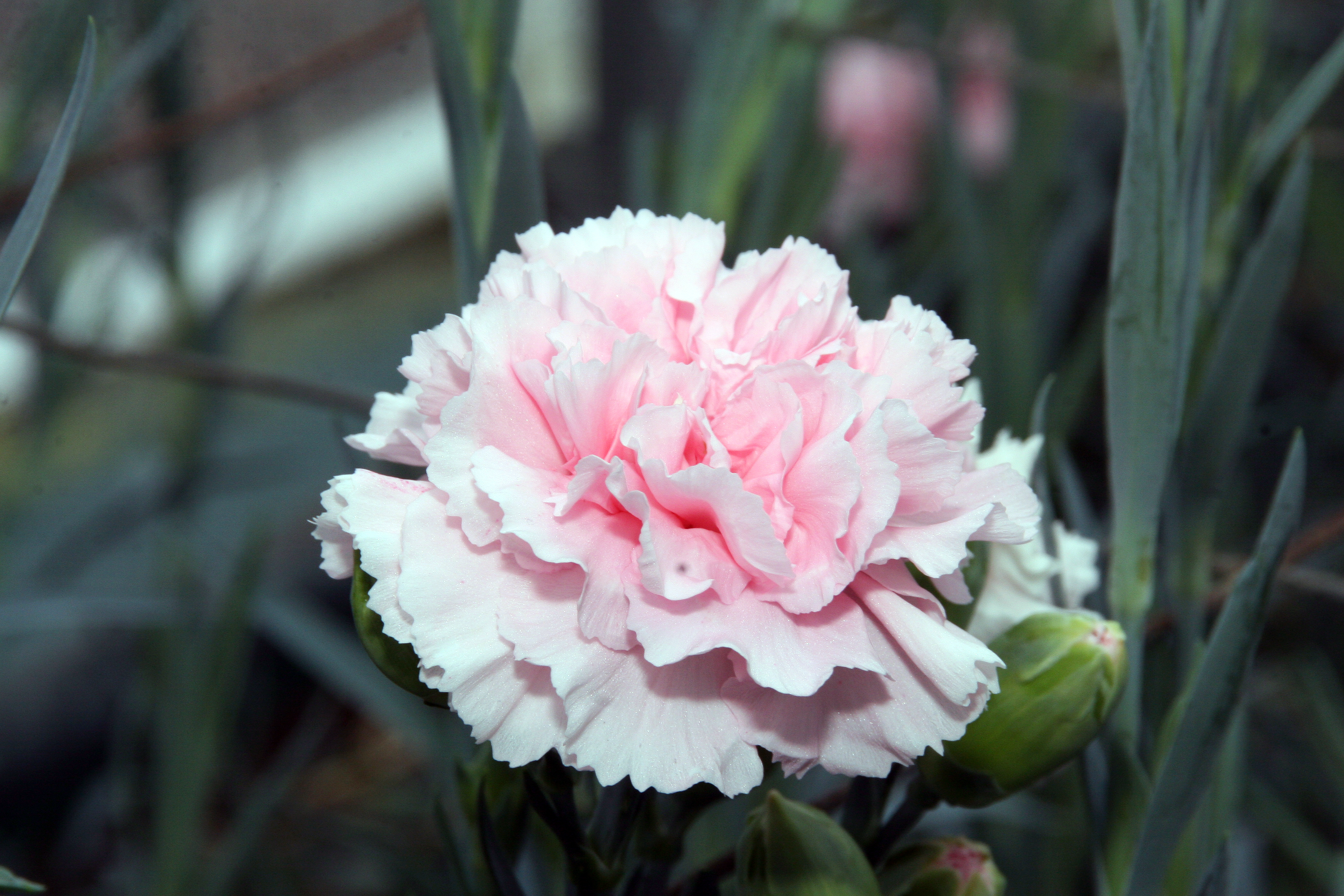
Carnation – Dianthus caryophyllus 'Malea'

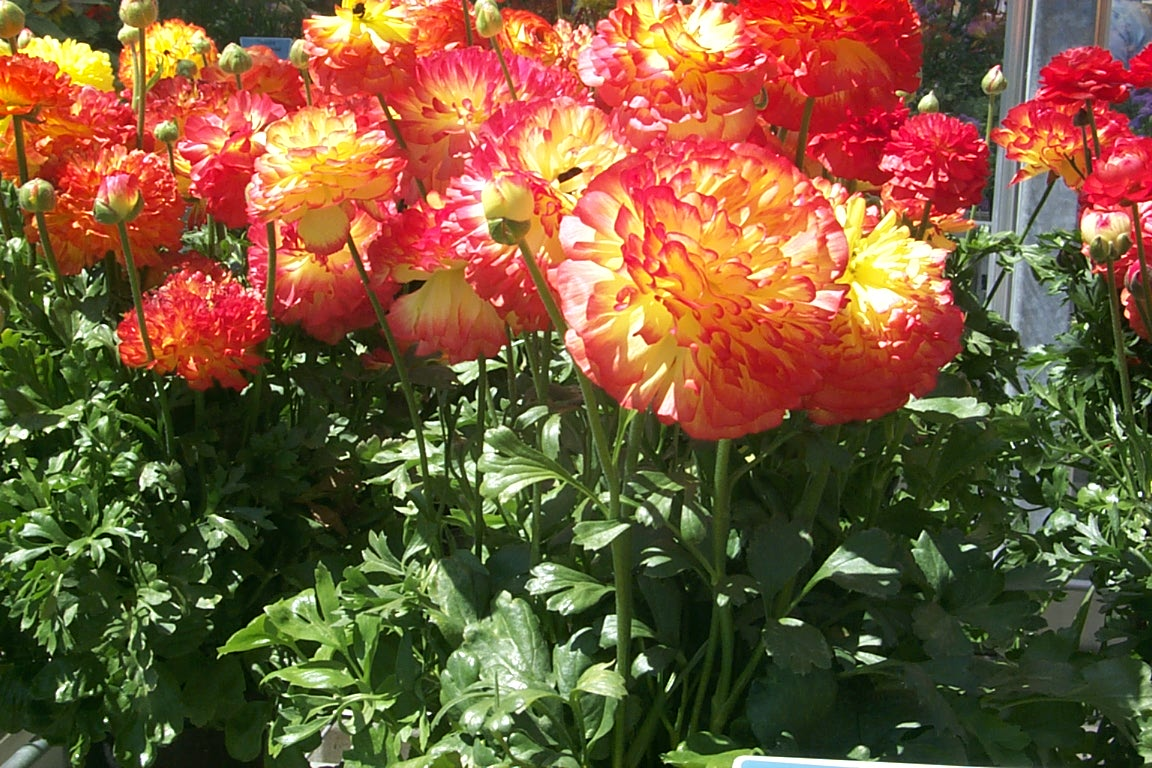
Persian buttercup – Ranunculus asiaticus

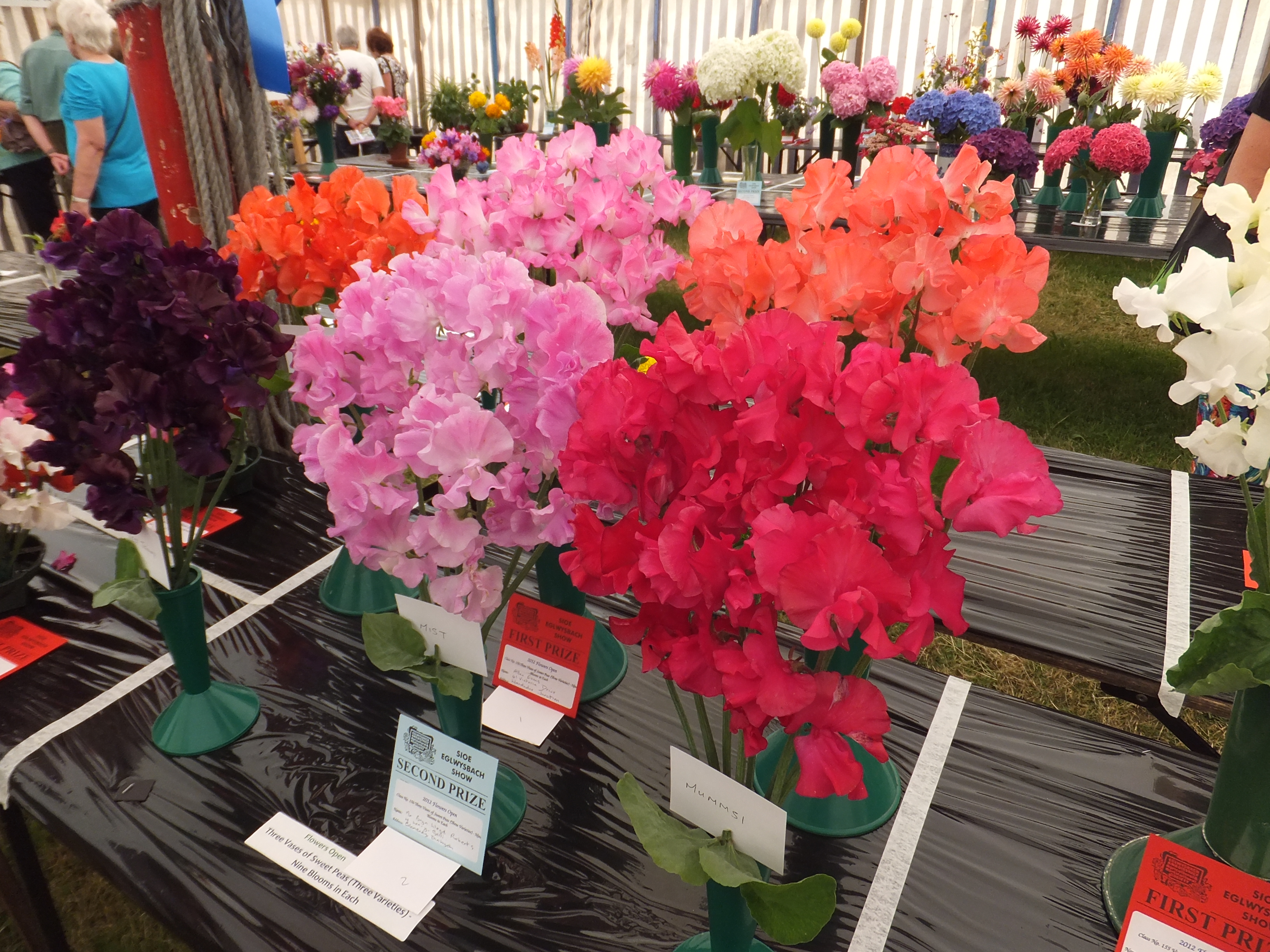
Sweet pea – Lathyrus odoratus

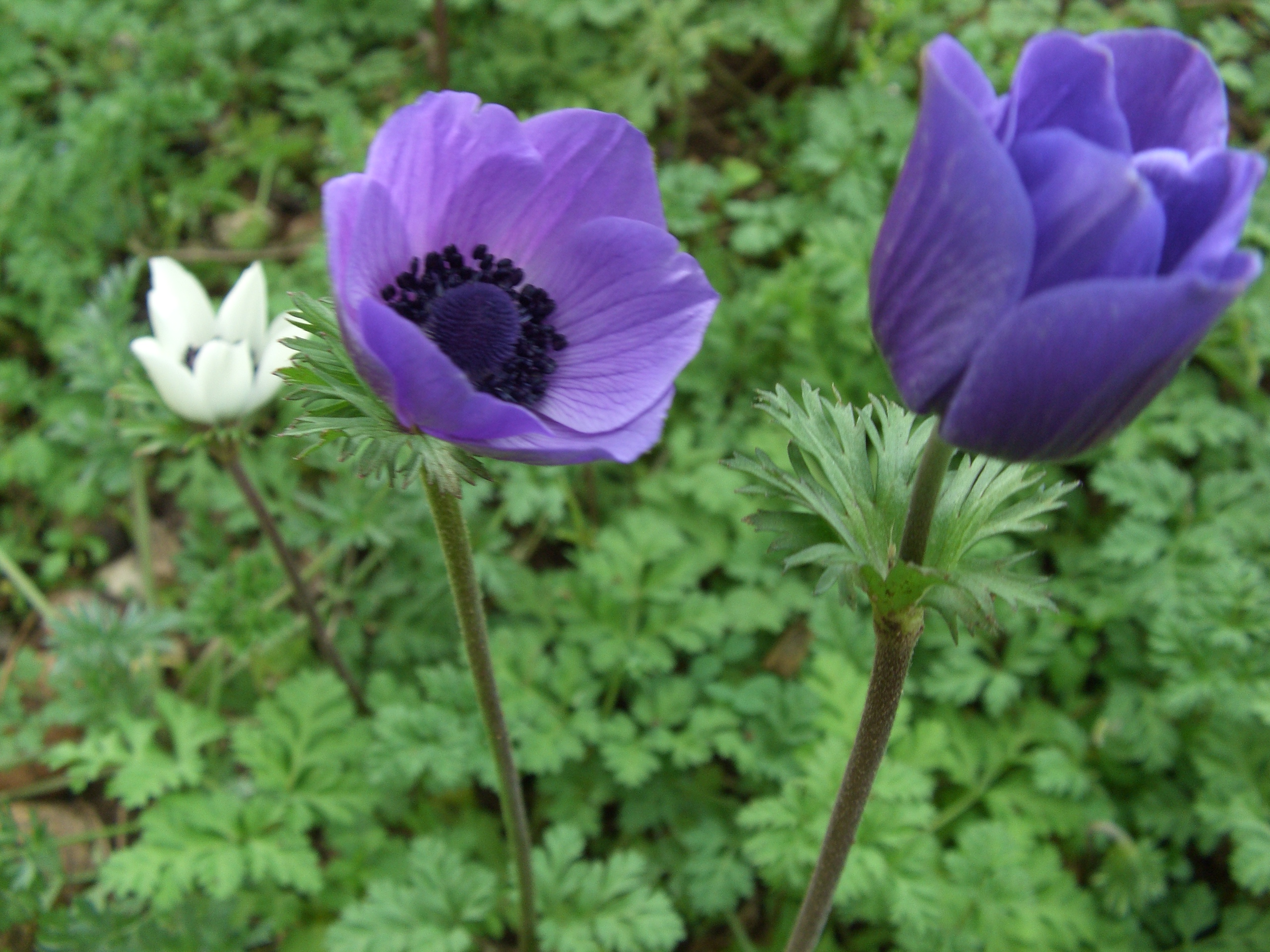
Poppy anemone – Anemone coronaria

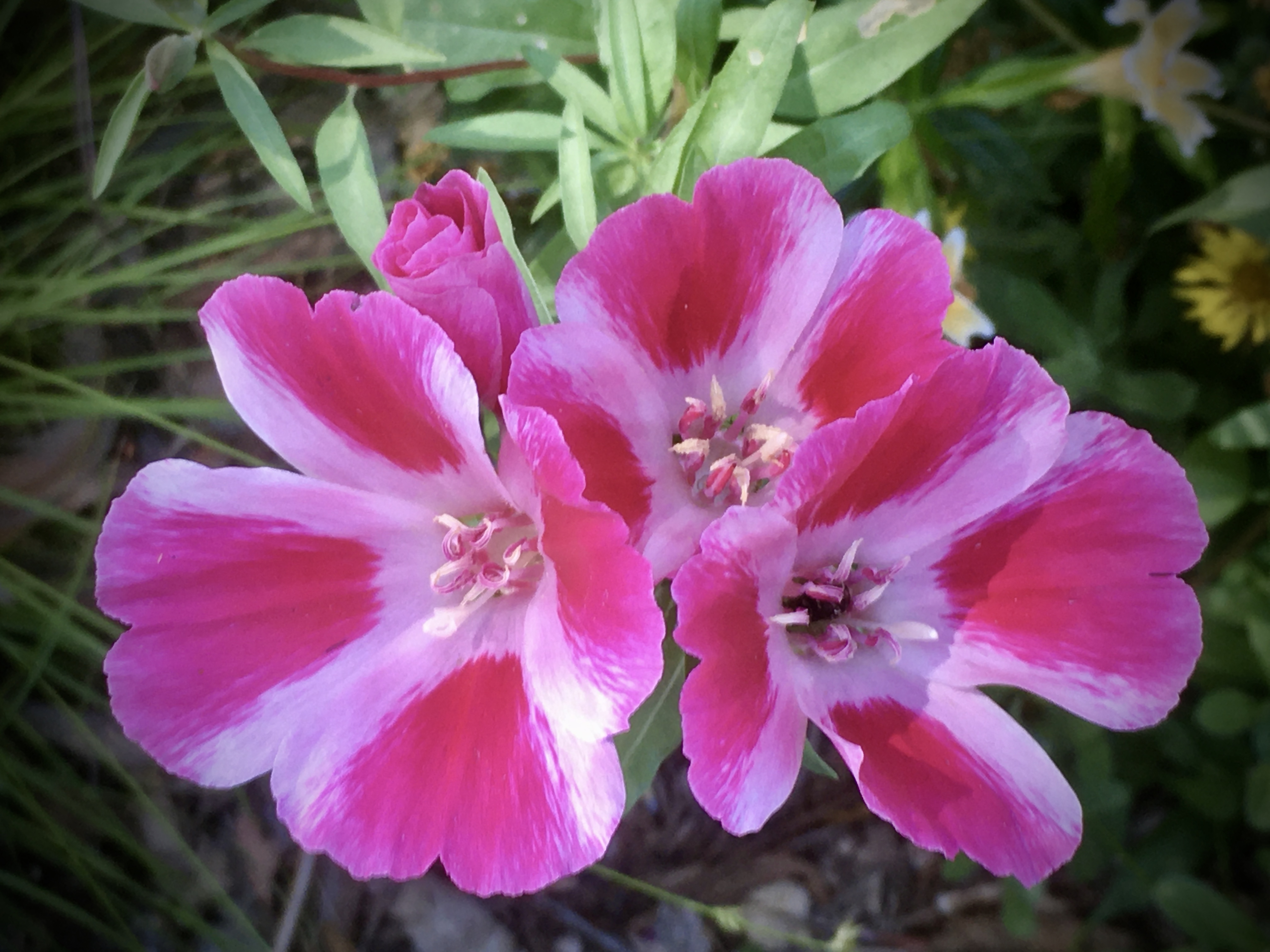
Satin Flower – Clarkia amoena 'Grace Rose'

=== Moderate temperature plants ===
These plants prefer to grow at temperatures of 15 °C (59 °F) to 24 °C (75 °F)

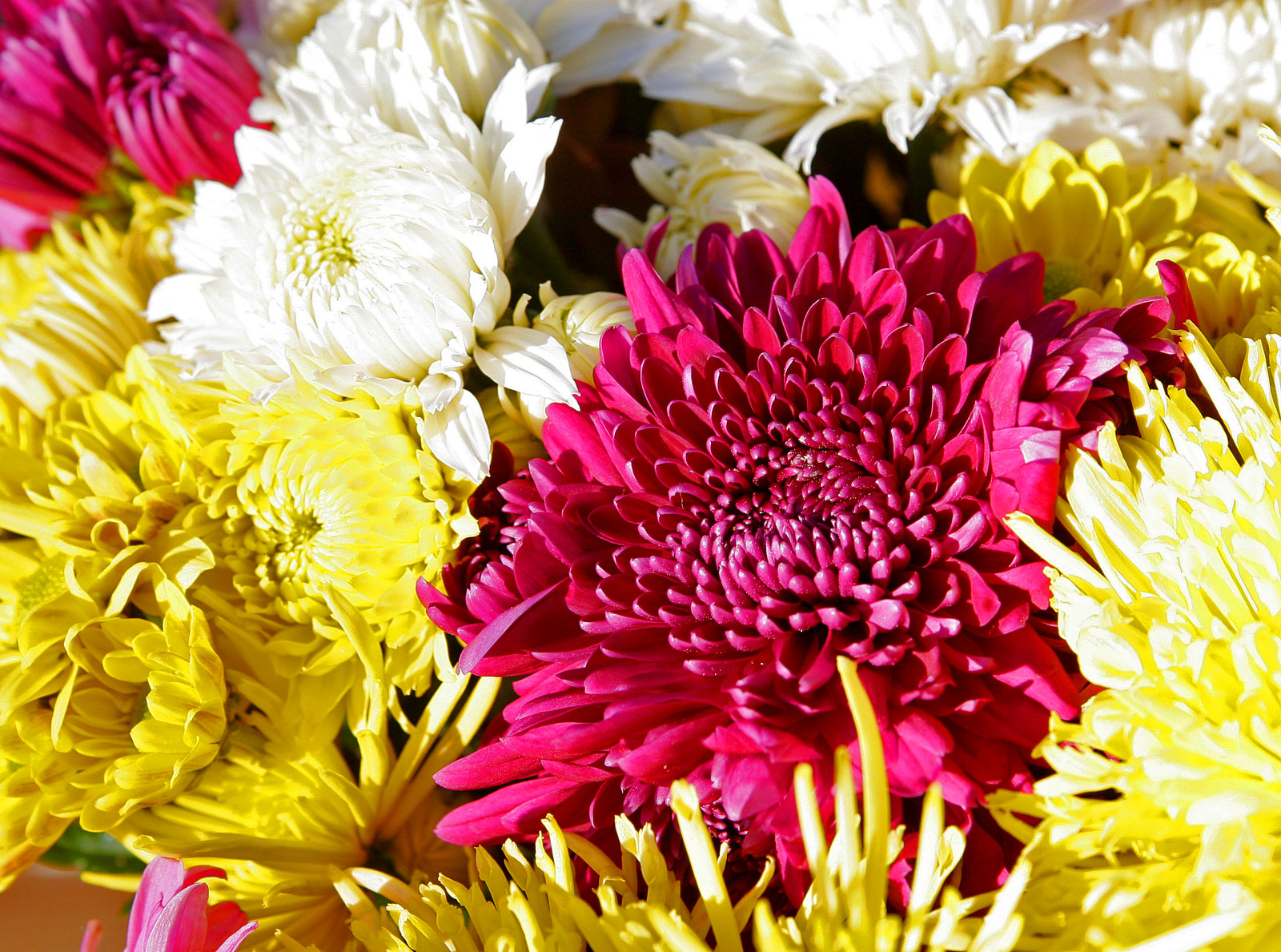
Mum – Chrysanthemum x morifolium

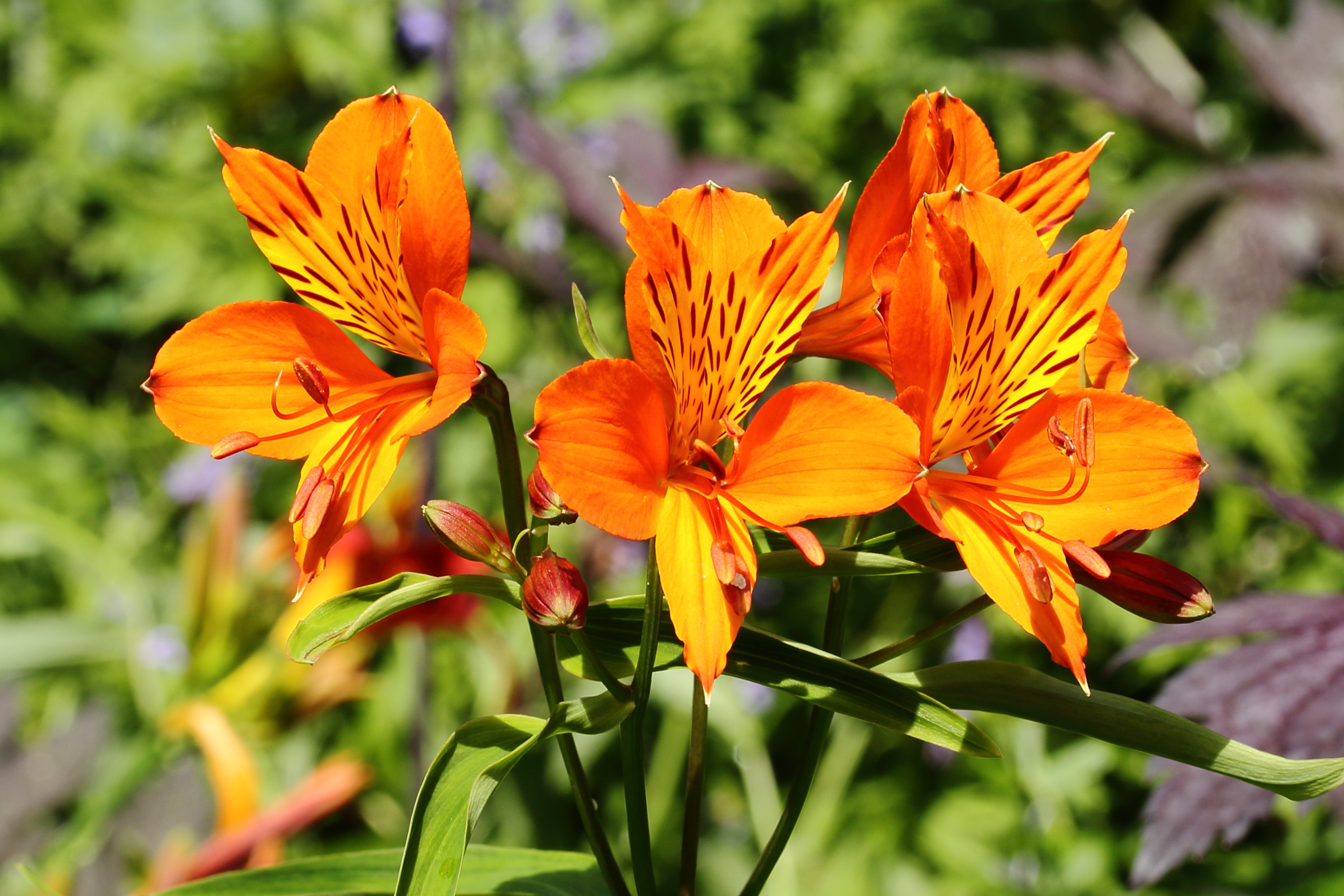
Inca lily – Alstroemeria aurea 'Orange King'

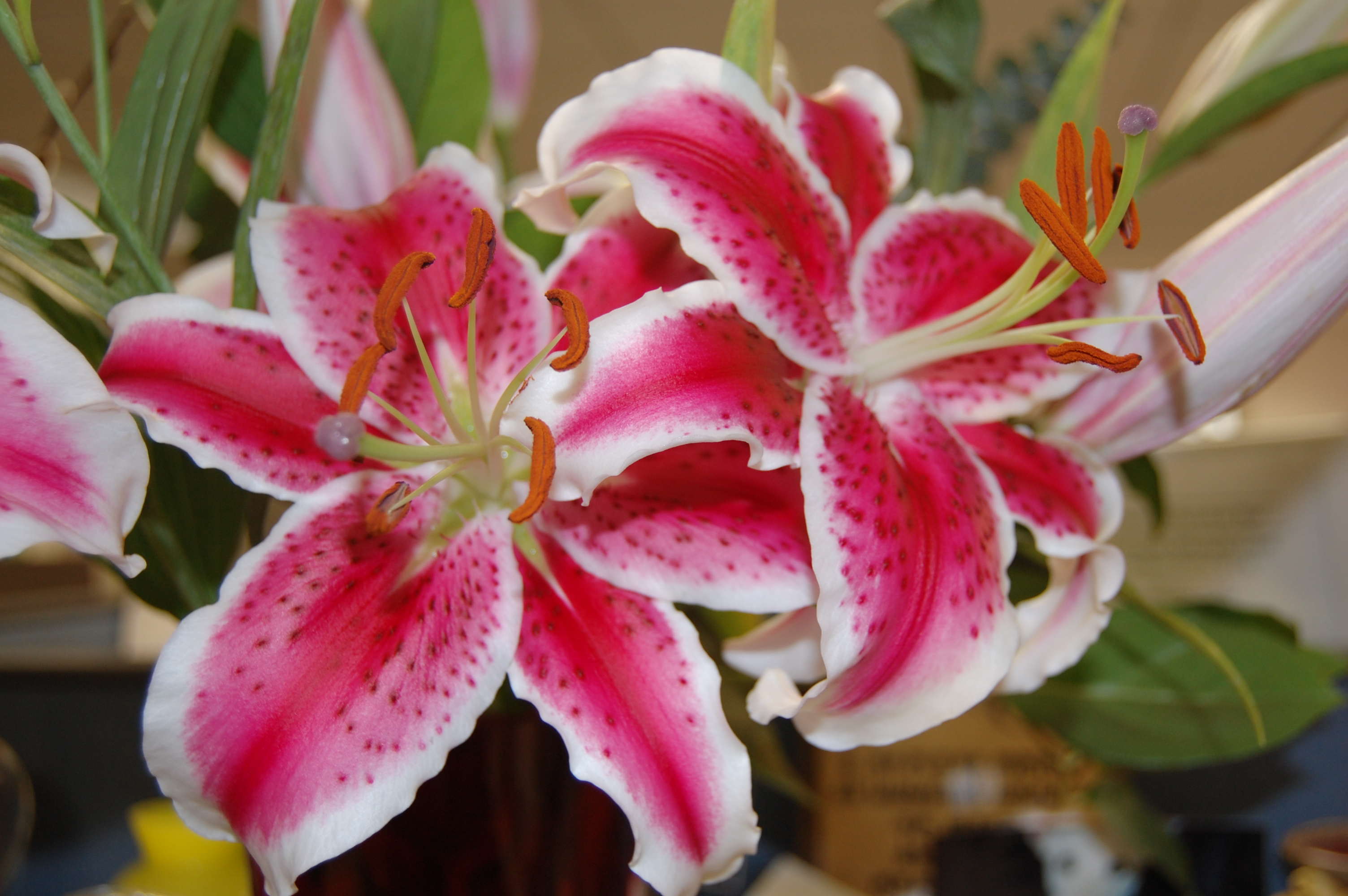
Oriental Hybrid Lily – Lilium orientalis 'Stargazer'

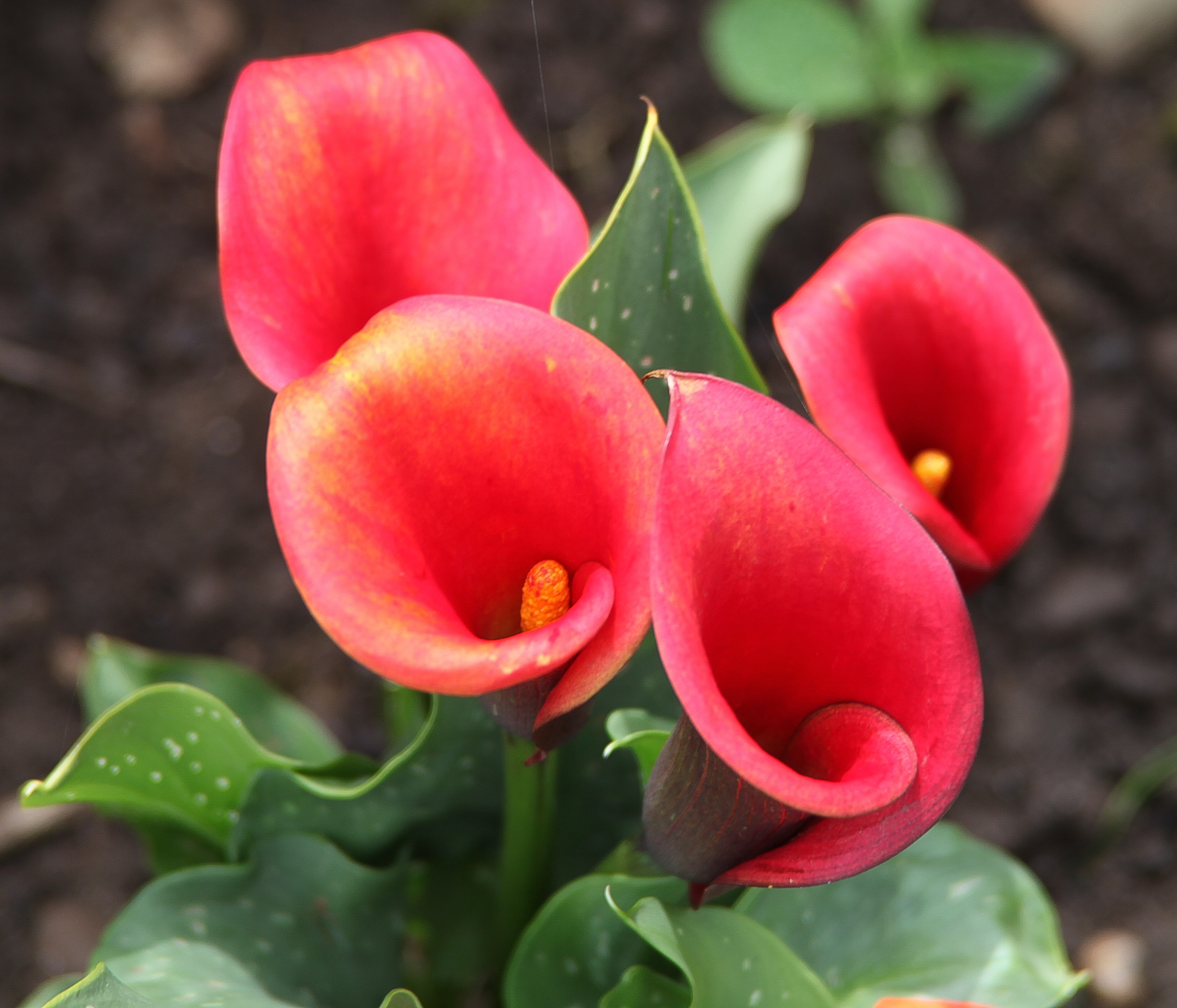
Calla – Zantedeschia 'Majestic Red'

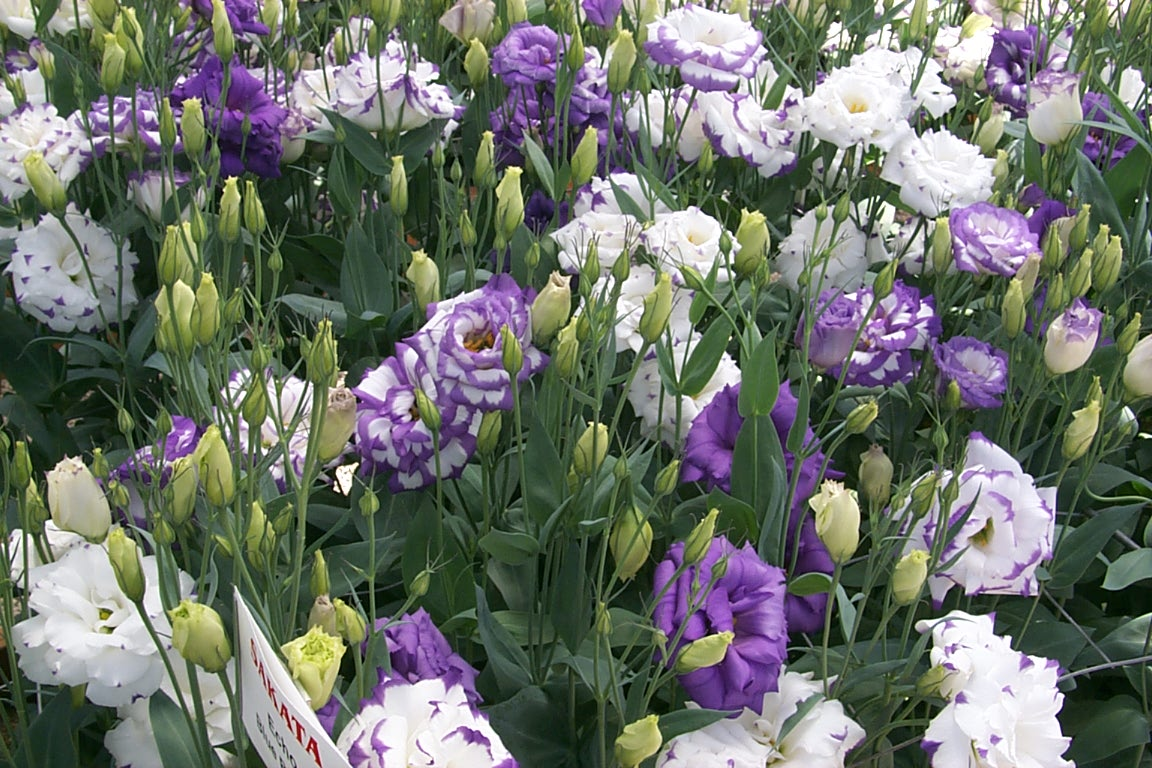
Lisianthus – Eustoma russelliana 'Echo'

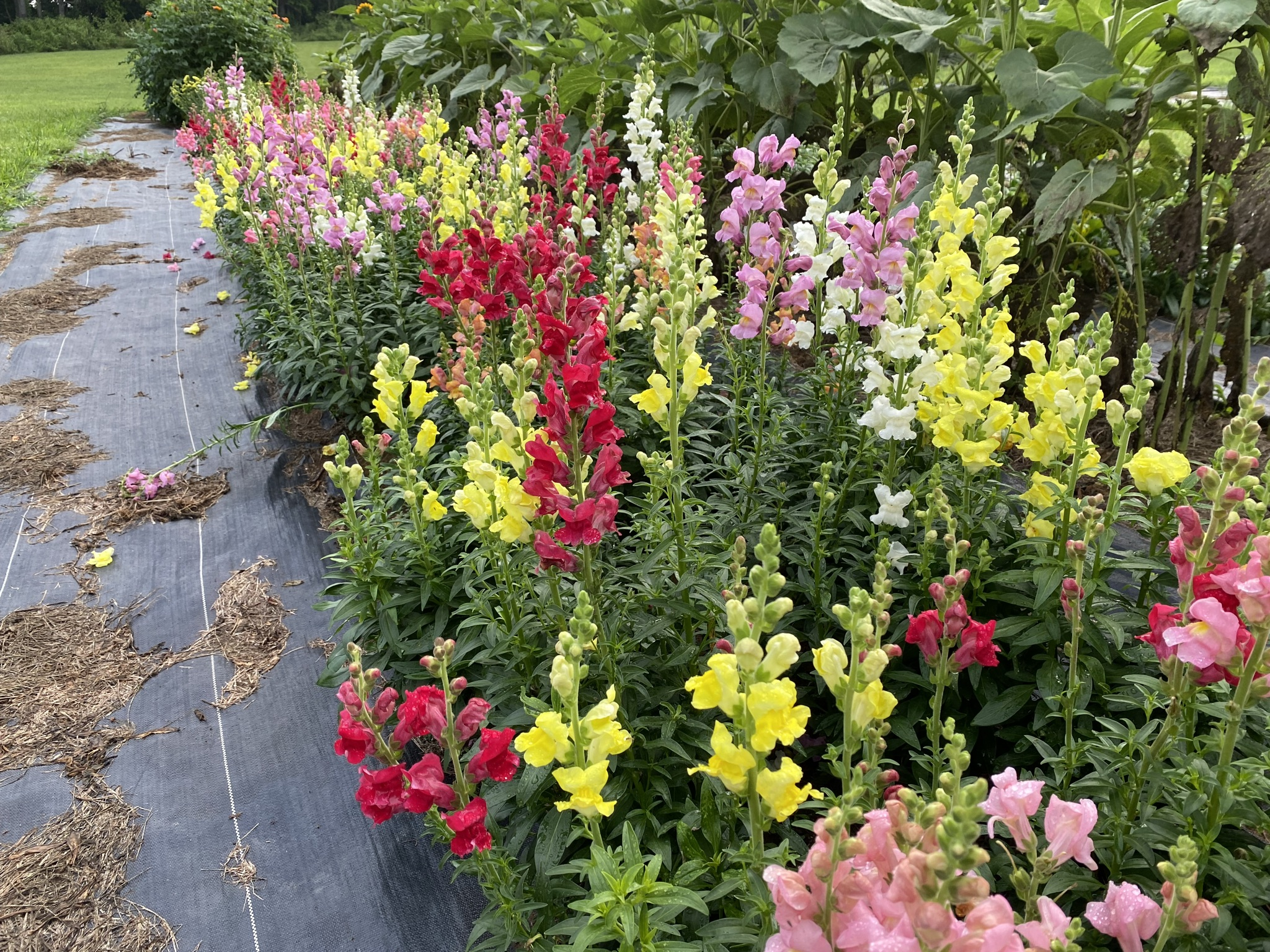
Snapdragon – Antirrhinum majus 'Rocket'

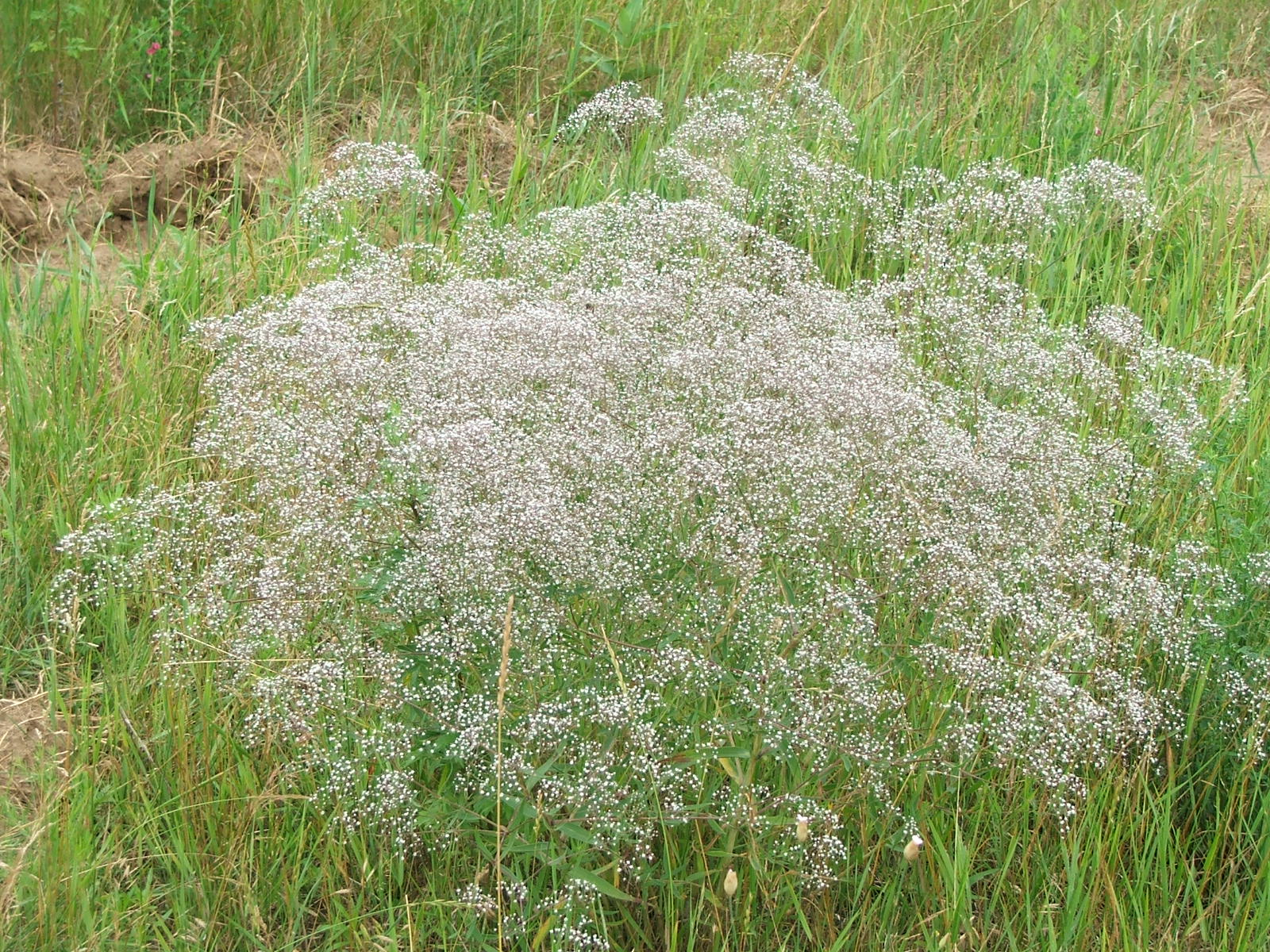
Baby's Breath – Gypsophila paniculata

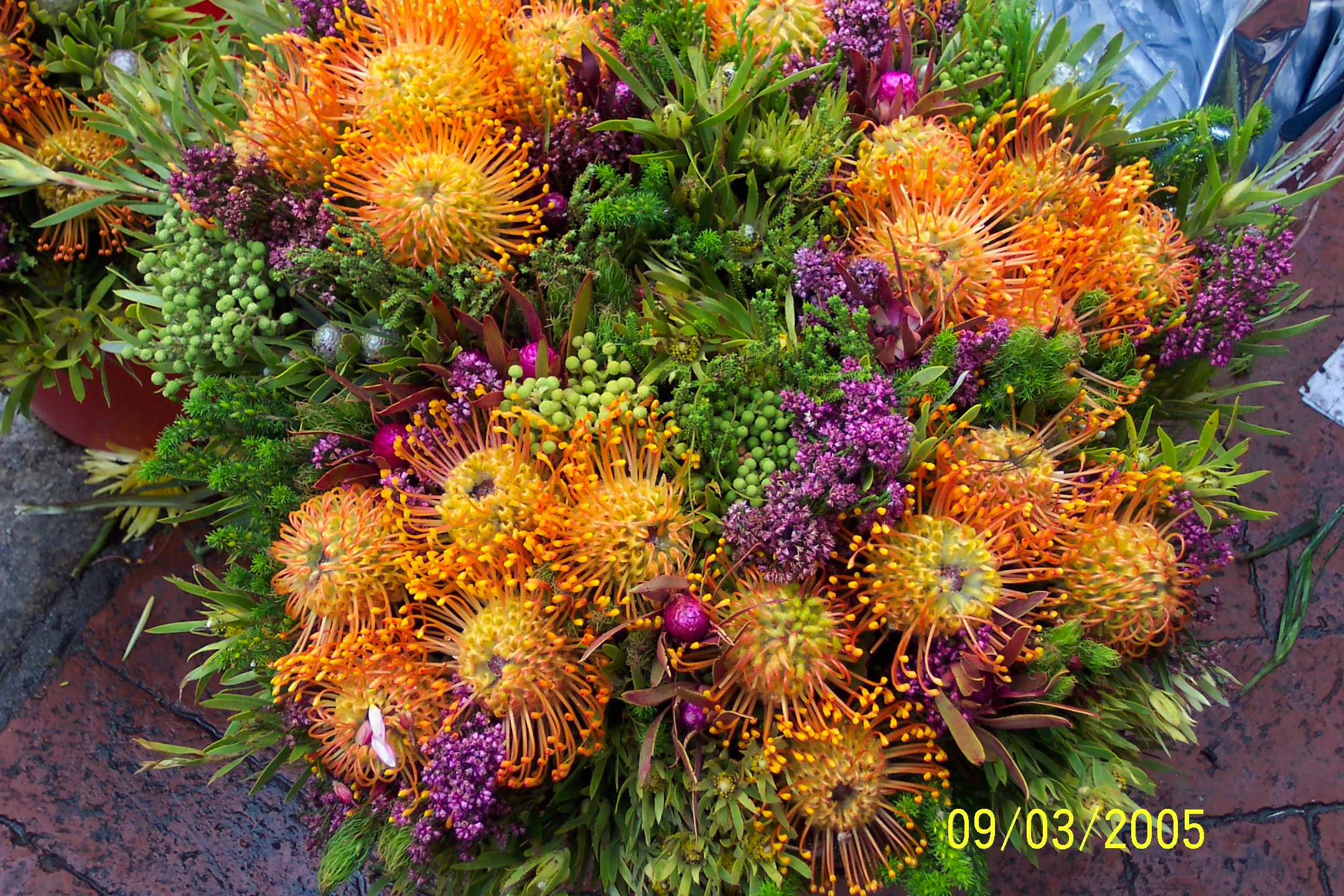
Pincushion flower – Leucospermum

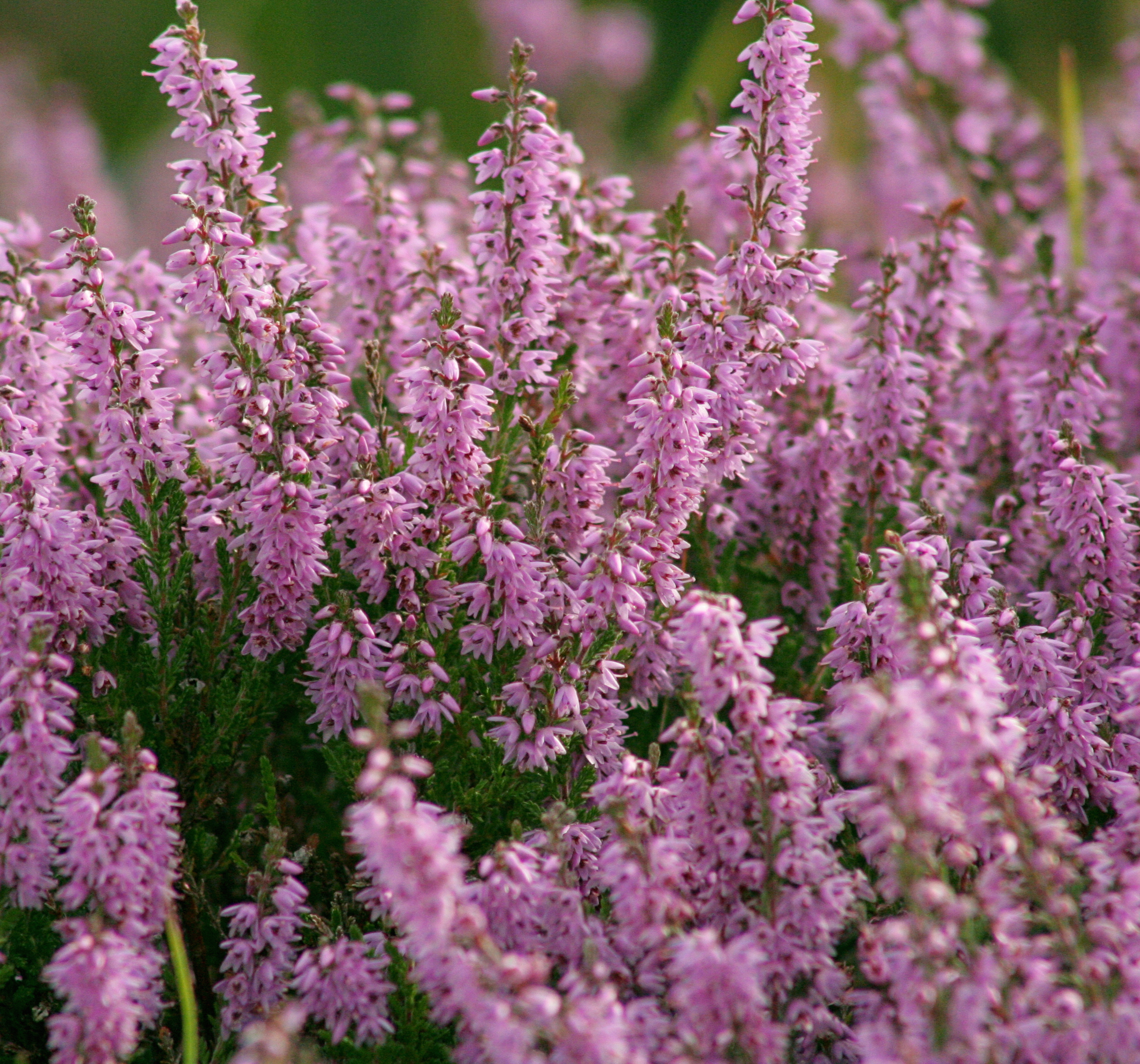
Heather – Calluna vulgaris

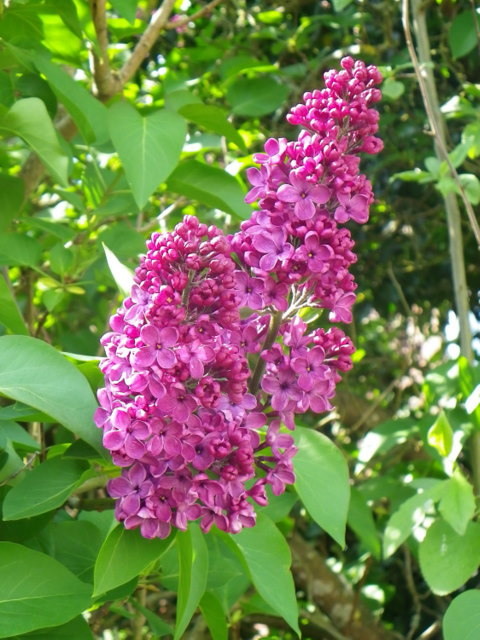
Lilac – Syringa vulgaris

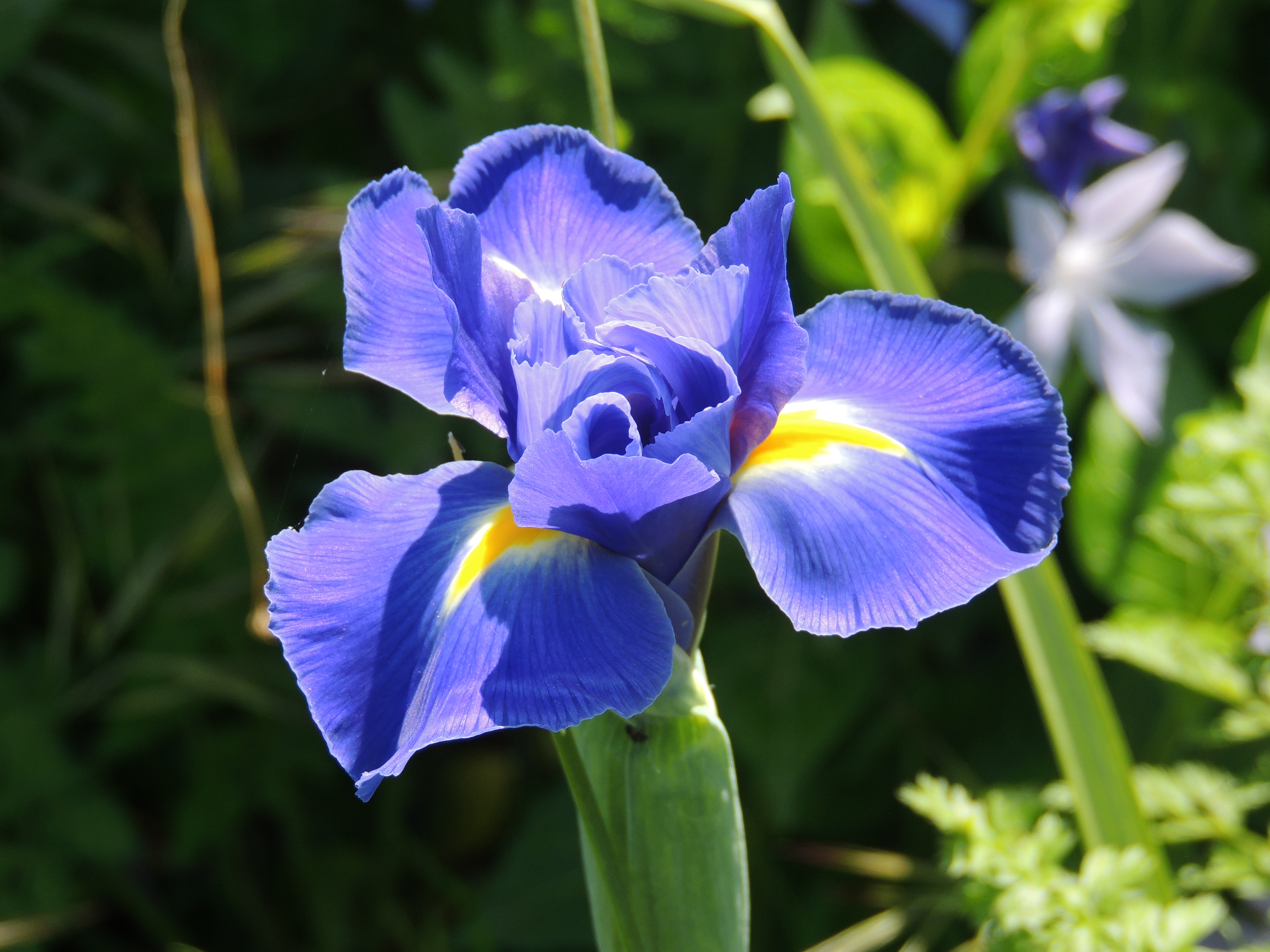
Dutch Iris – Iris x hollandica

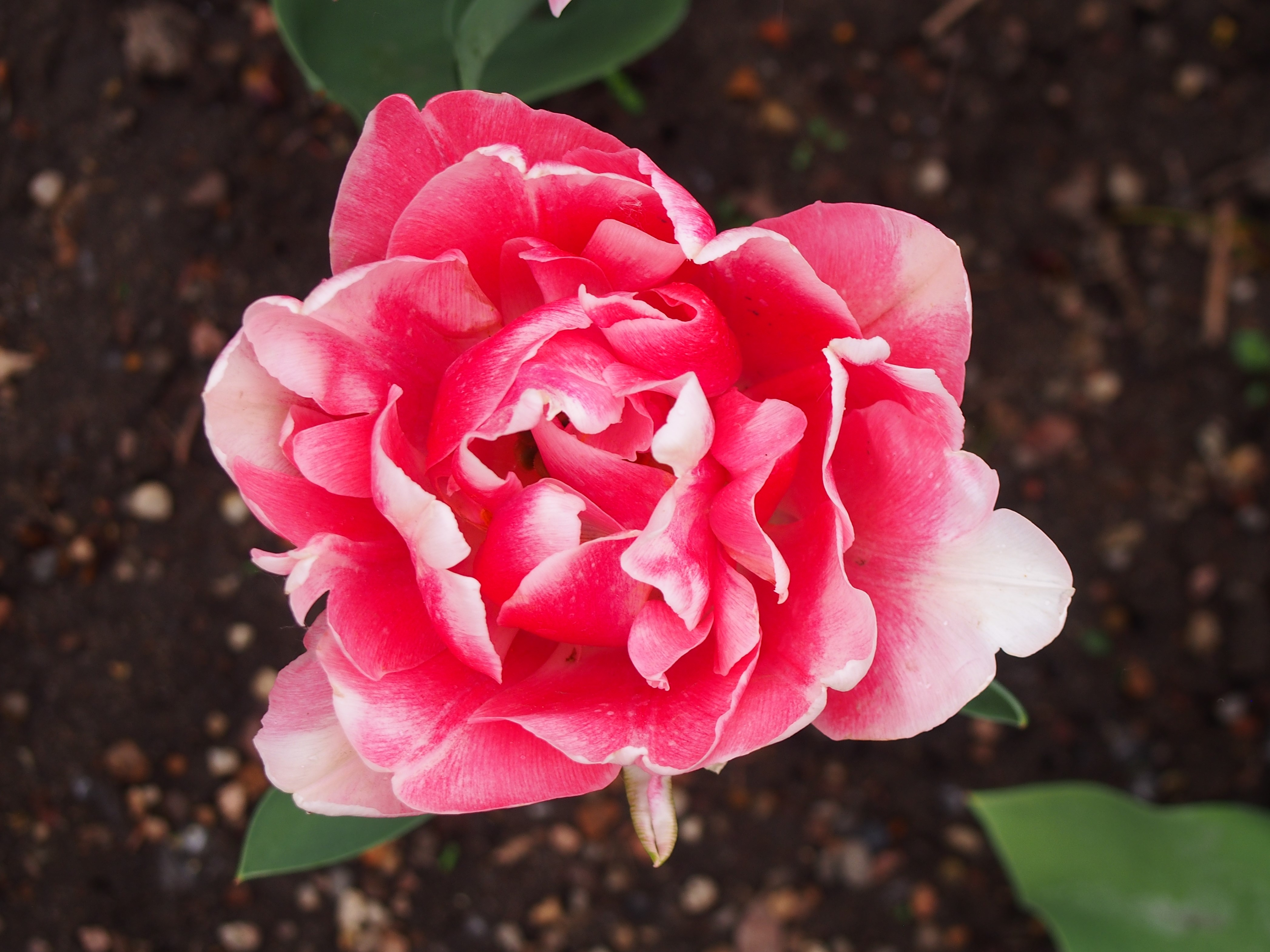
Double flowering Tulip – Tulipa 'Angelique'

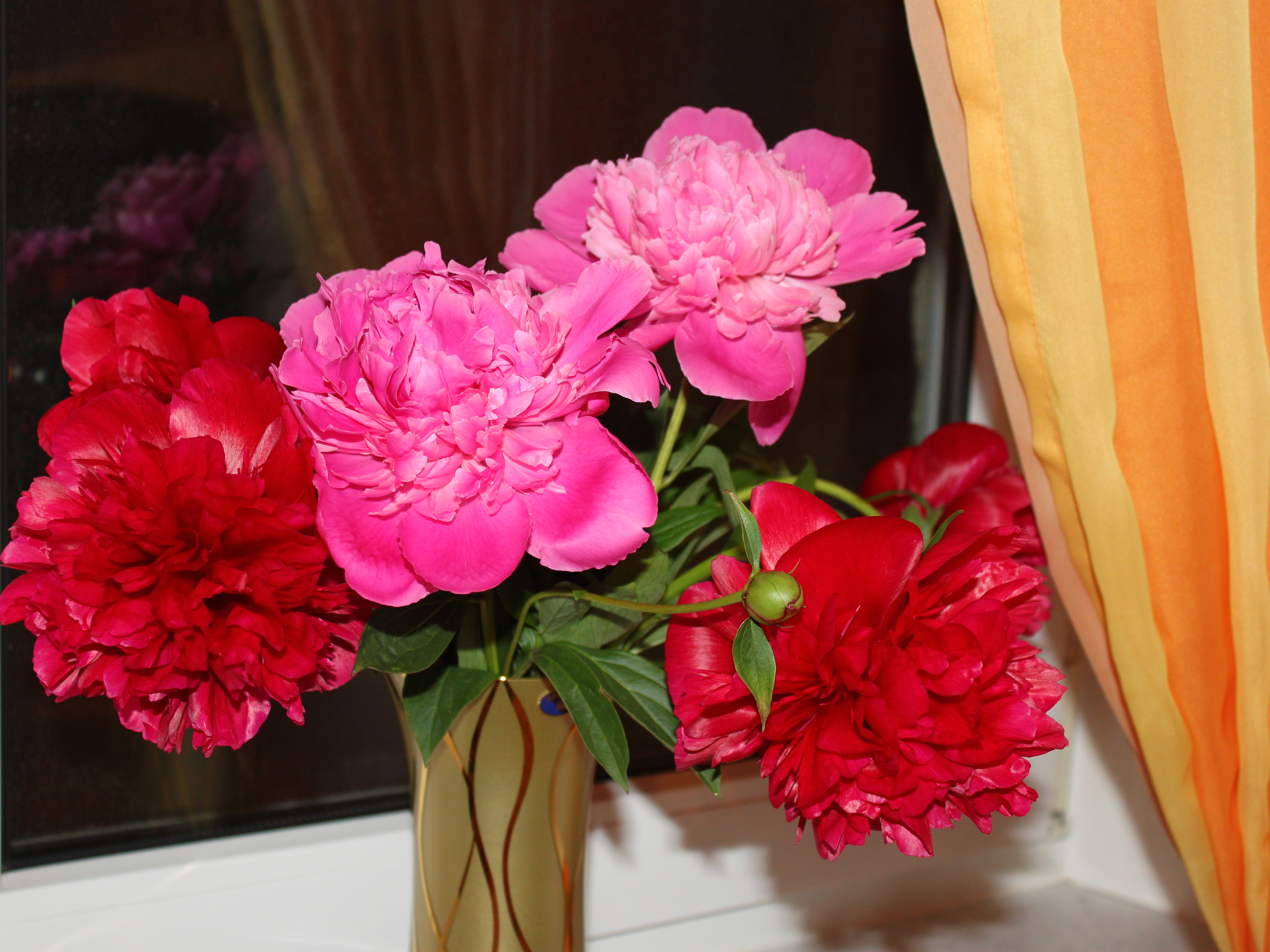
Peony – Paeonia lactiflora

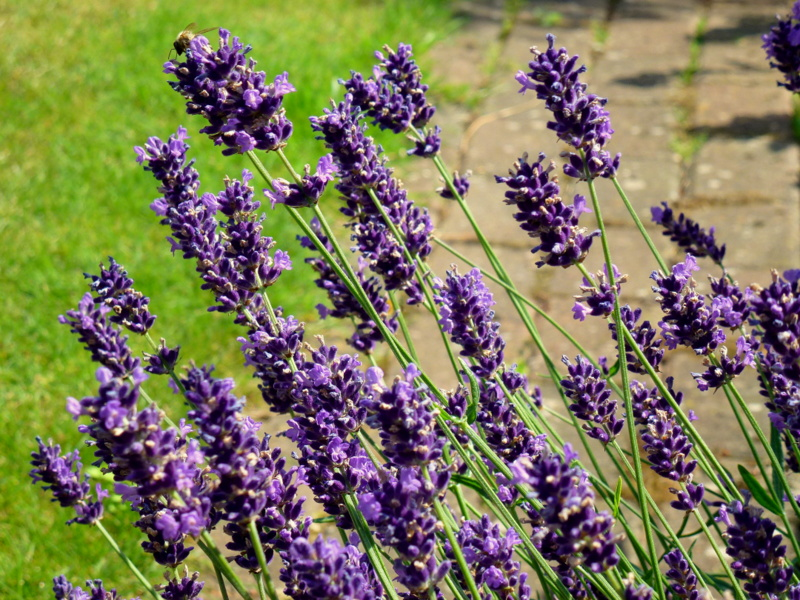
Lavender – Lavendula angustifolia 'Hidcote'

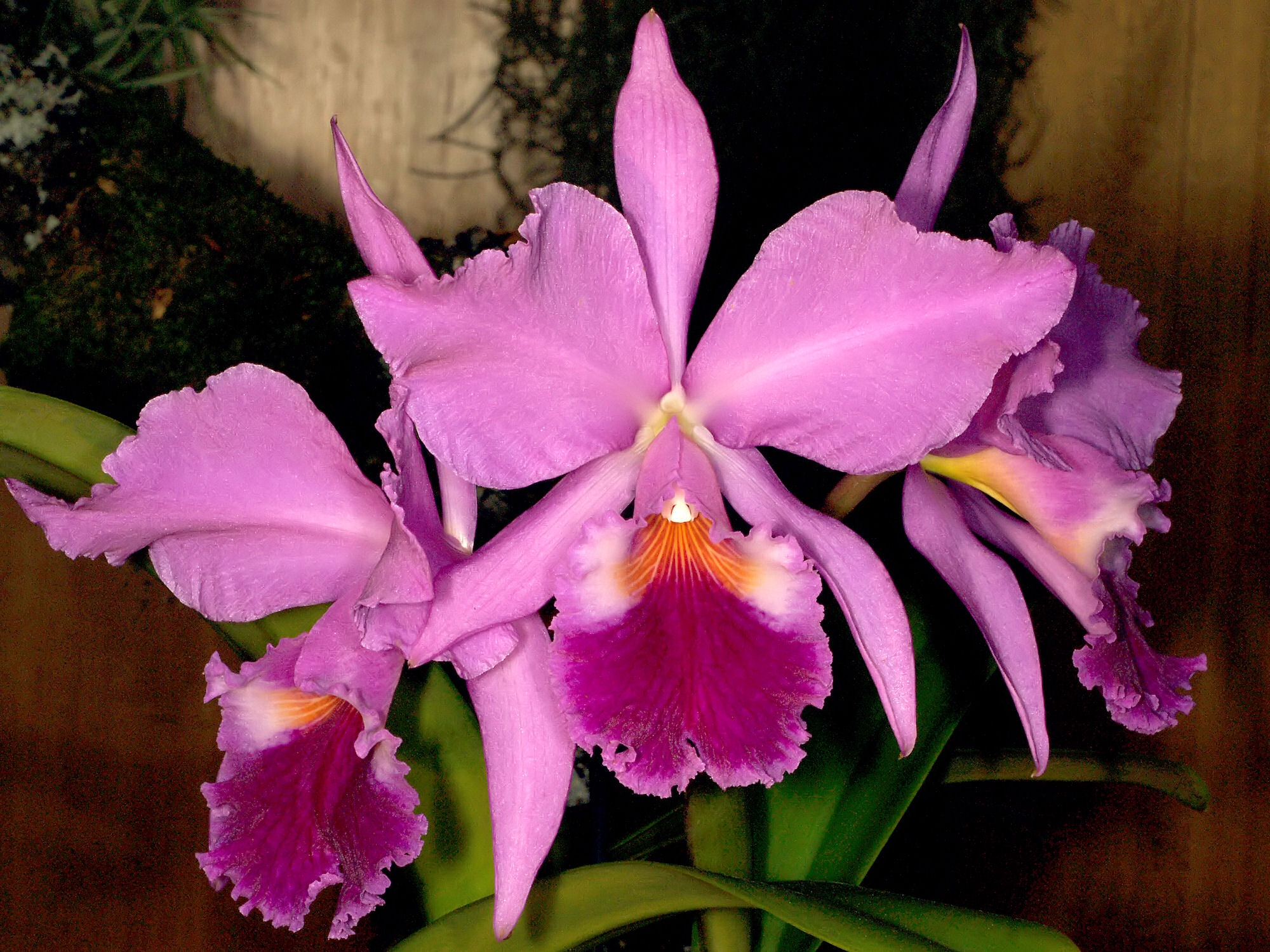
Corsage Orchid – Cattleya labiata

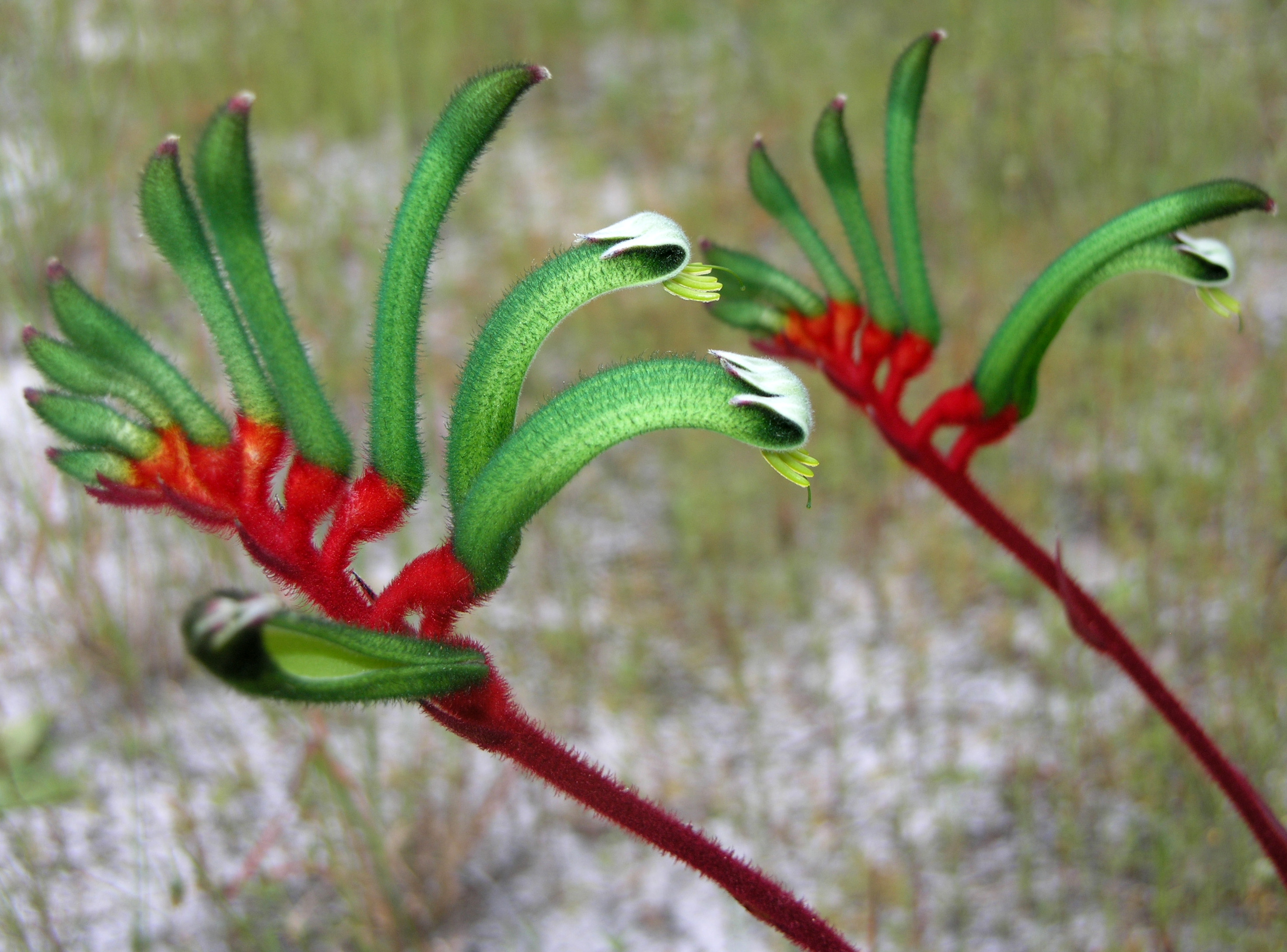
Red and green Kangaroo Paw – Anigozanthos manglesii

Others – Banksia marginata, Chinese Lanterns – Alkekengi, Clematis – Clematis, Cyclamen – Cyclamen persicum, Epacris impressa, Fuchsia – Fuchsia, Freesia – Freesia, Leucodendron, Love-in-a-Mist – Nigella damascena, Pansy – Viola x wittrockiana, Pelargonium, Primrose – Primula, Protea

=== Warm temperature plants ===
These plants prefer to grow at temperatures of 18 °C (65 °F) to 30 °C (86 °F)

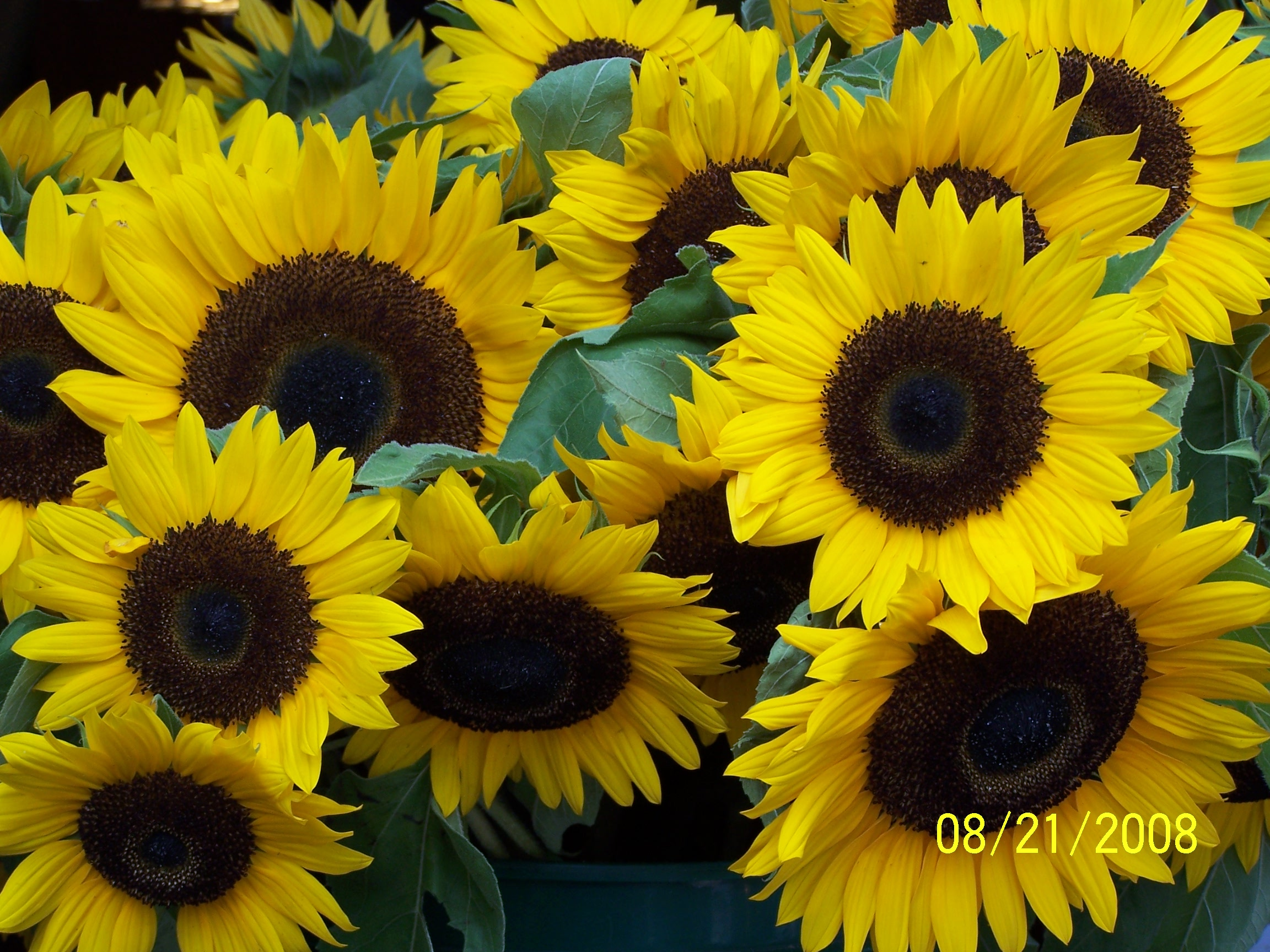
Sunflower – Helianthus annuus

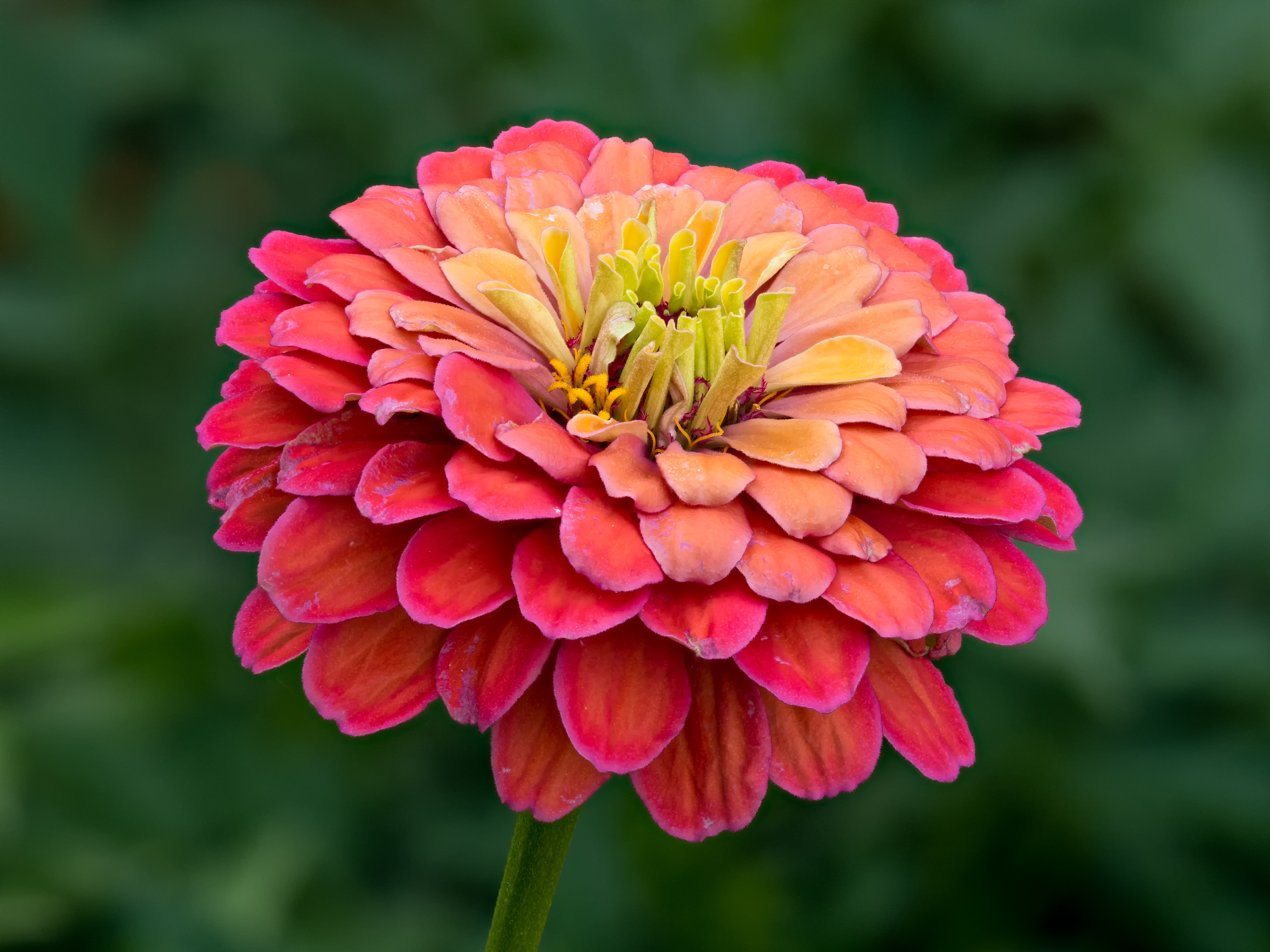
Zinnia – Zinnia elegans

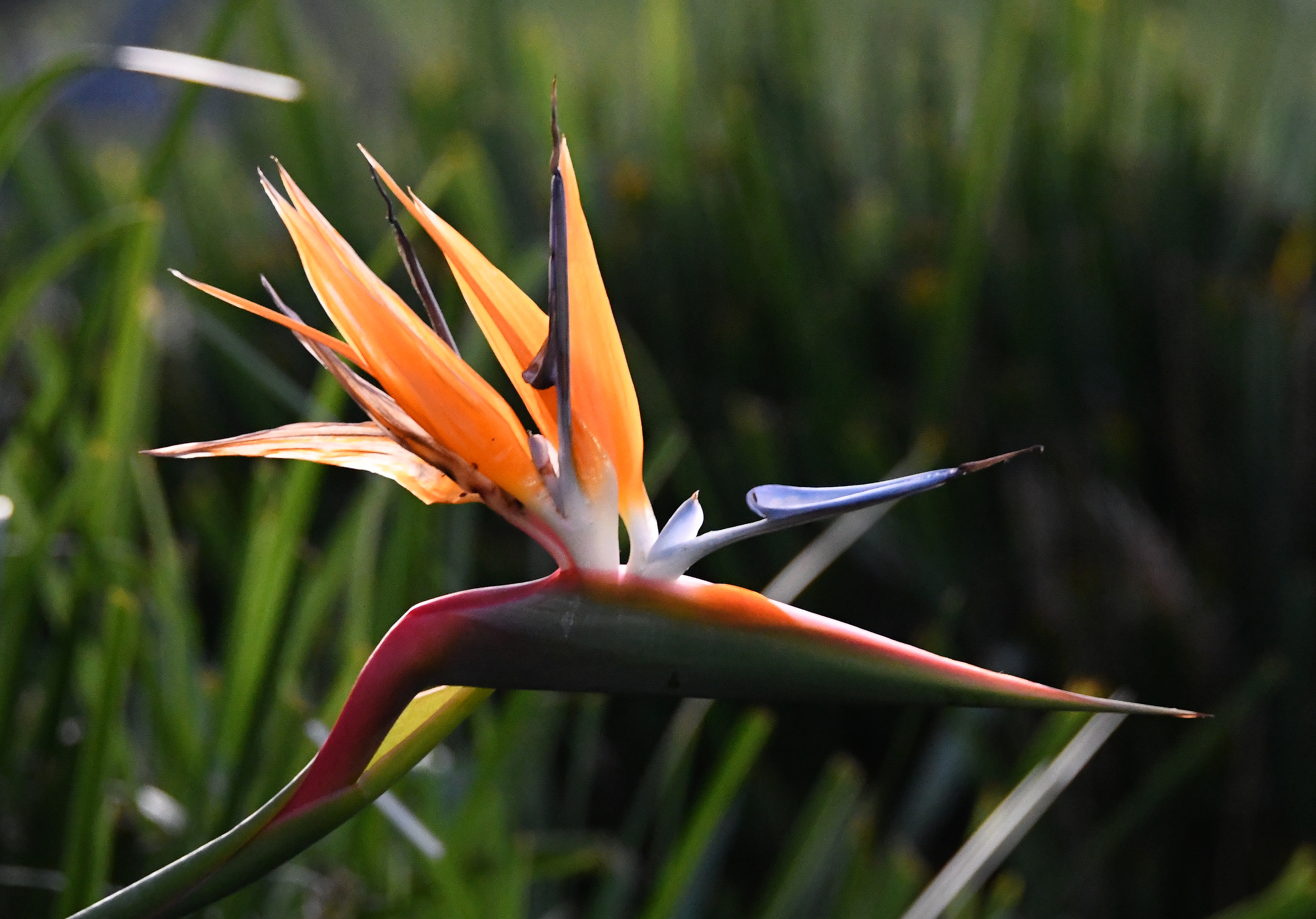
Bird of Paradise – Strelitzia reginae

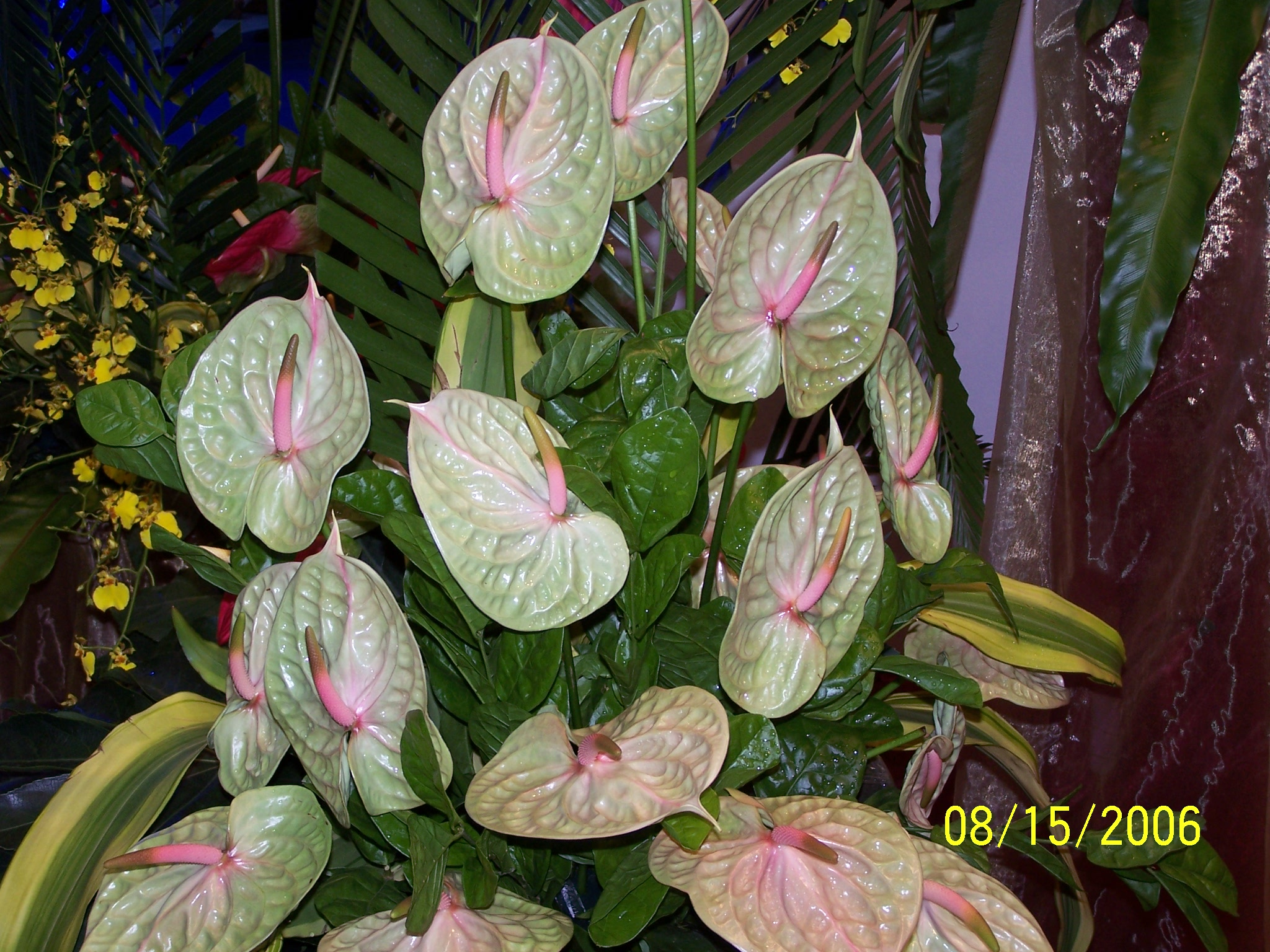
Flamingo lily – Anthurium andraeanum

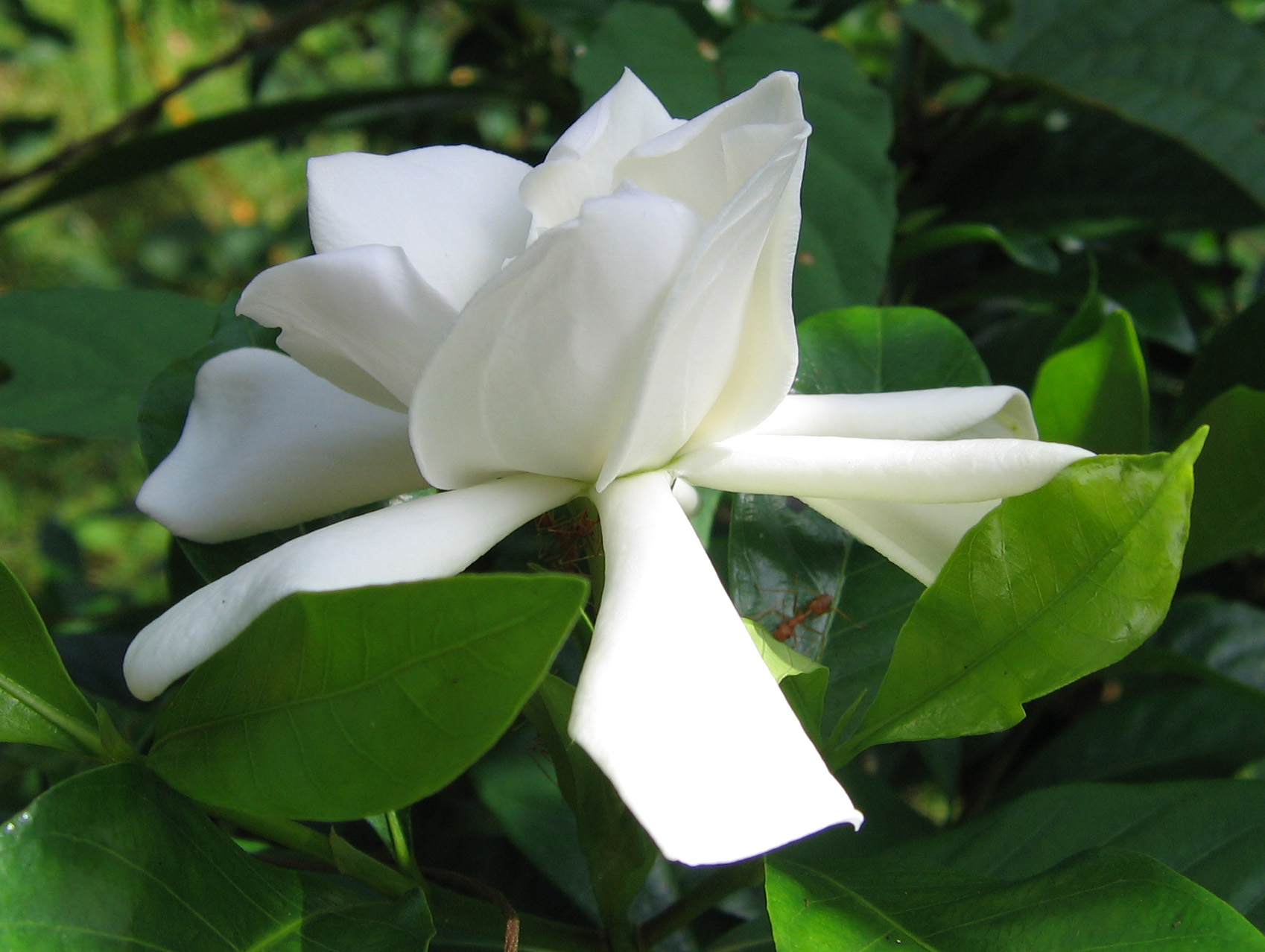
Gardenia – Gardenia jasminoides

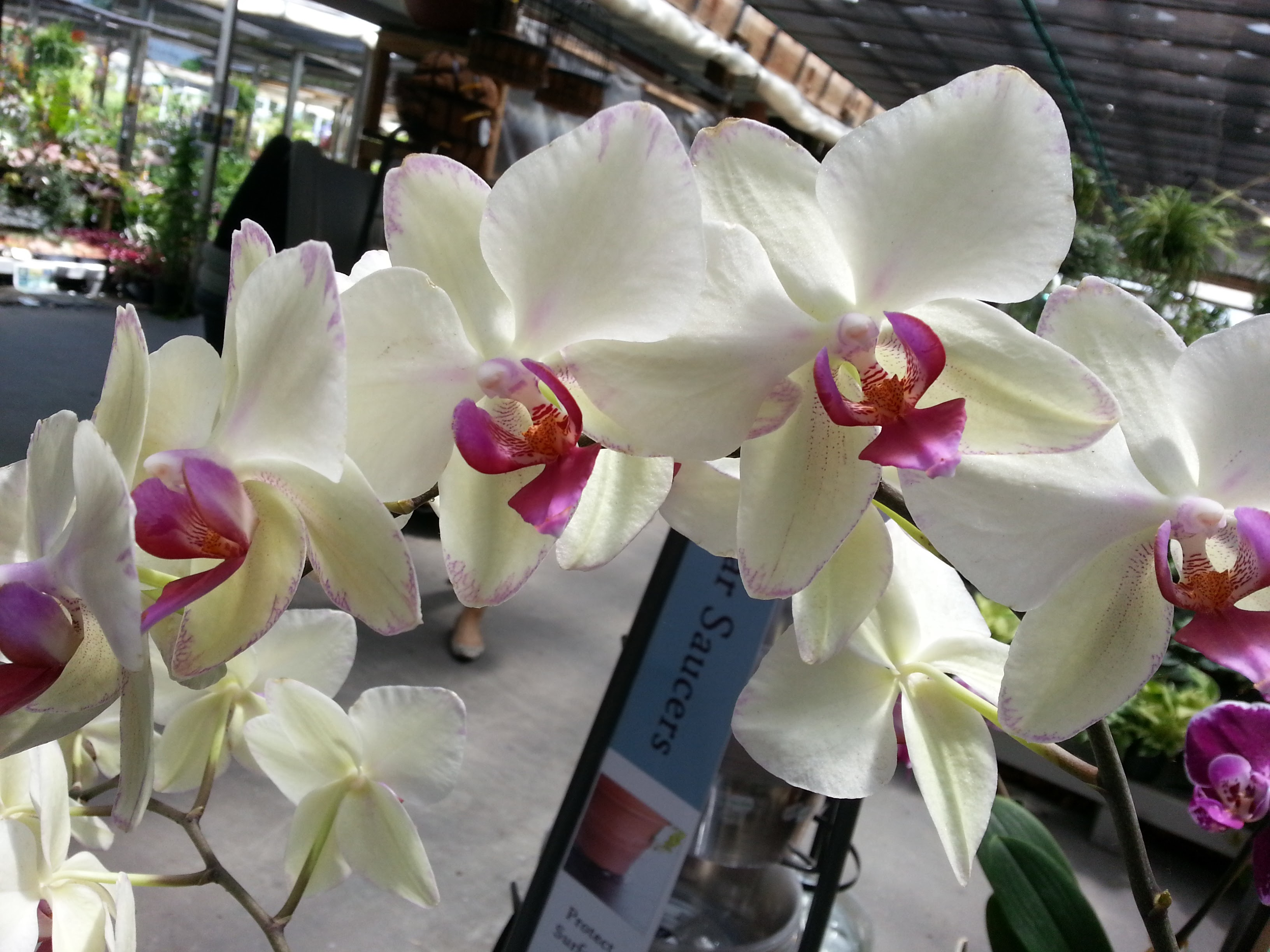
Moth Orchid – Phalaenopsis

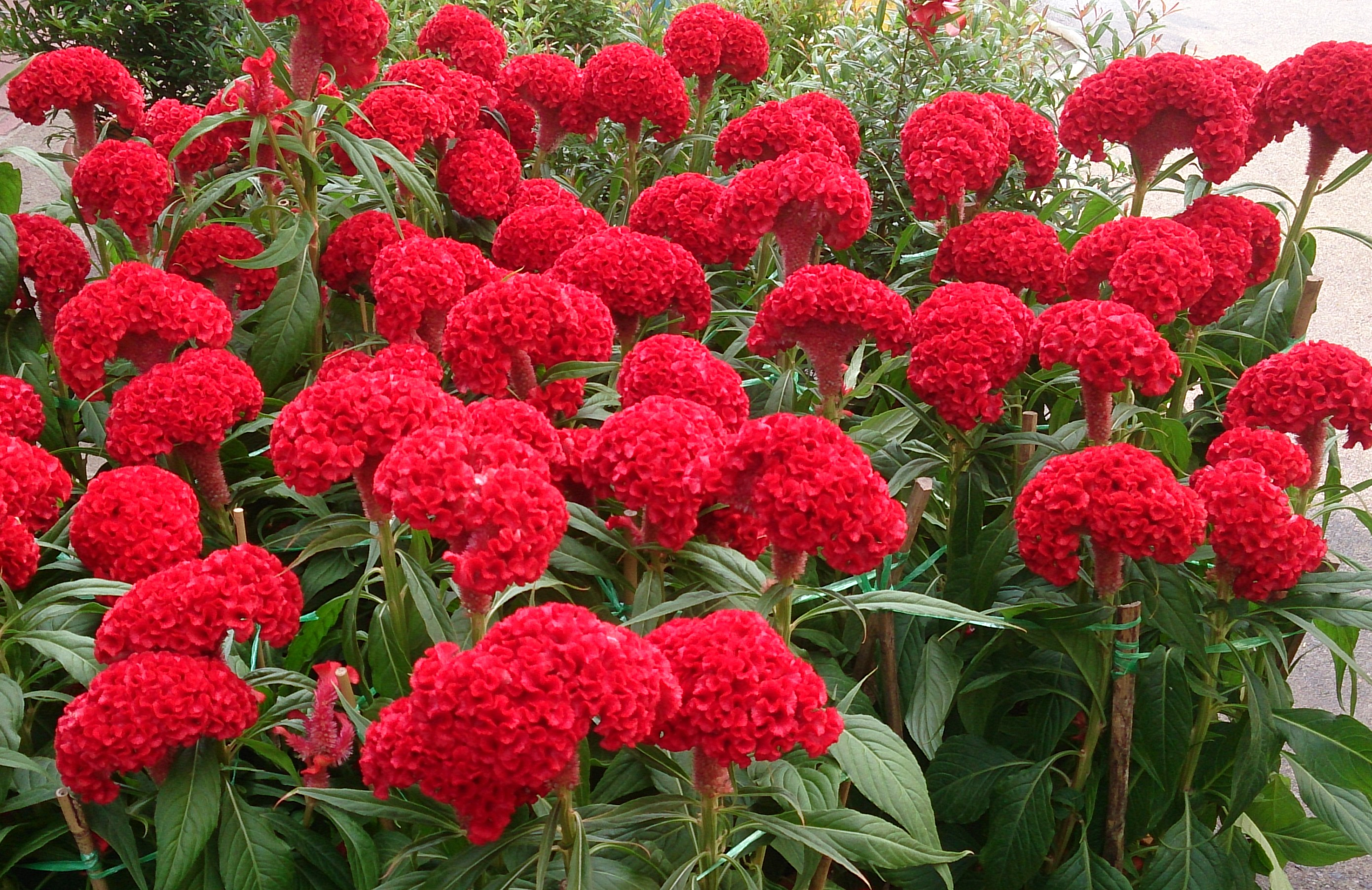
Cockscomb – Celosia argentea

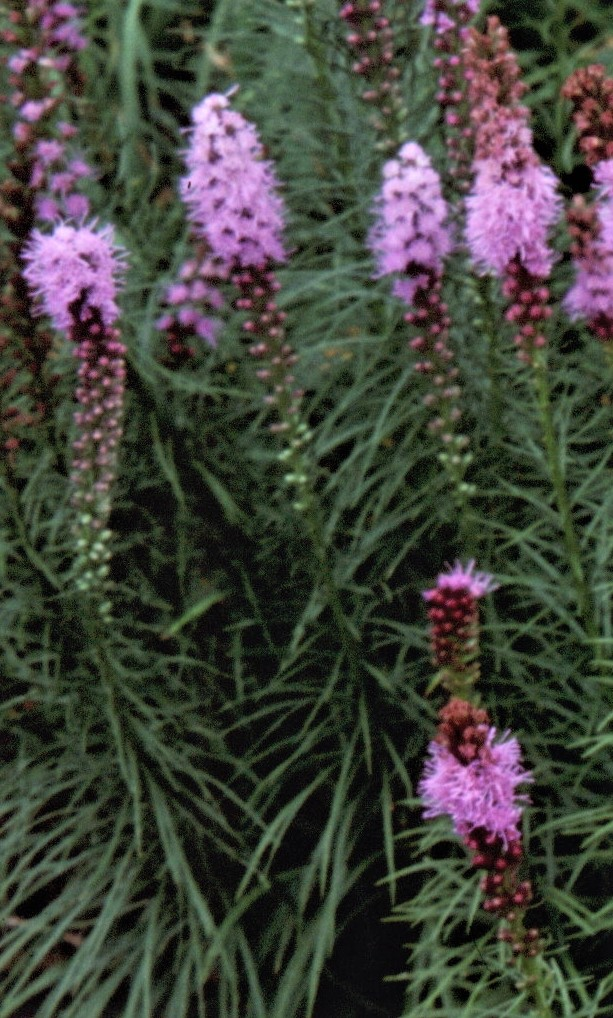
Blazing star – Liatris spicata 'Kobold'

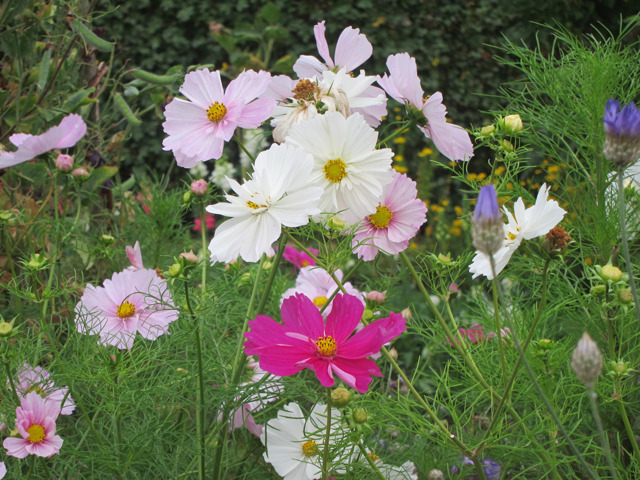
Cosmos – Cosmos bipinnatus

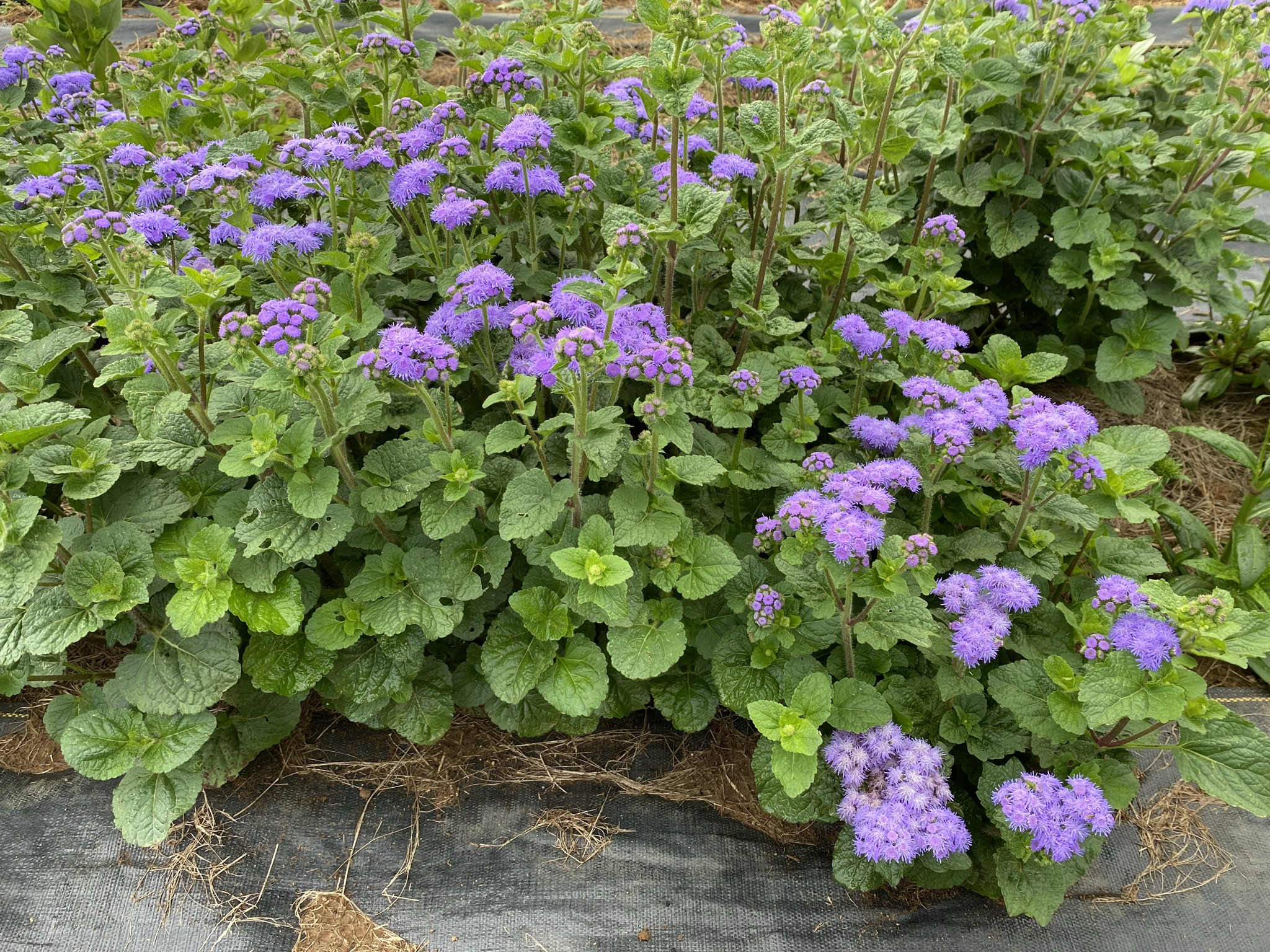
Floss flower – Ageratum houstonianum 'Blue Horizon'

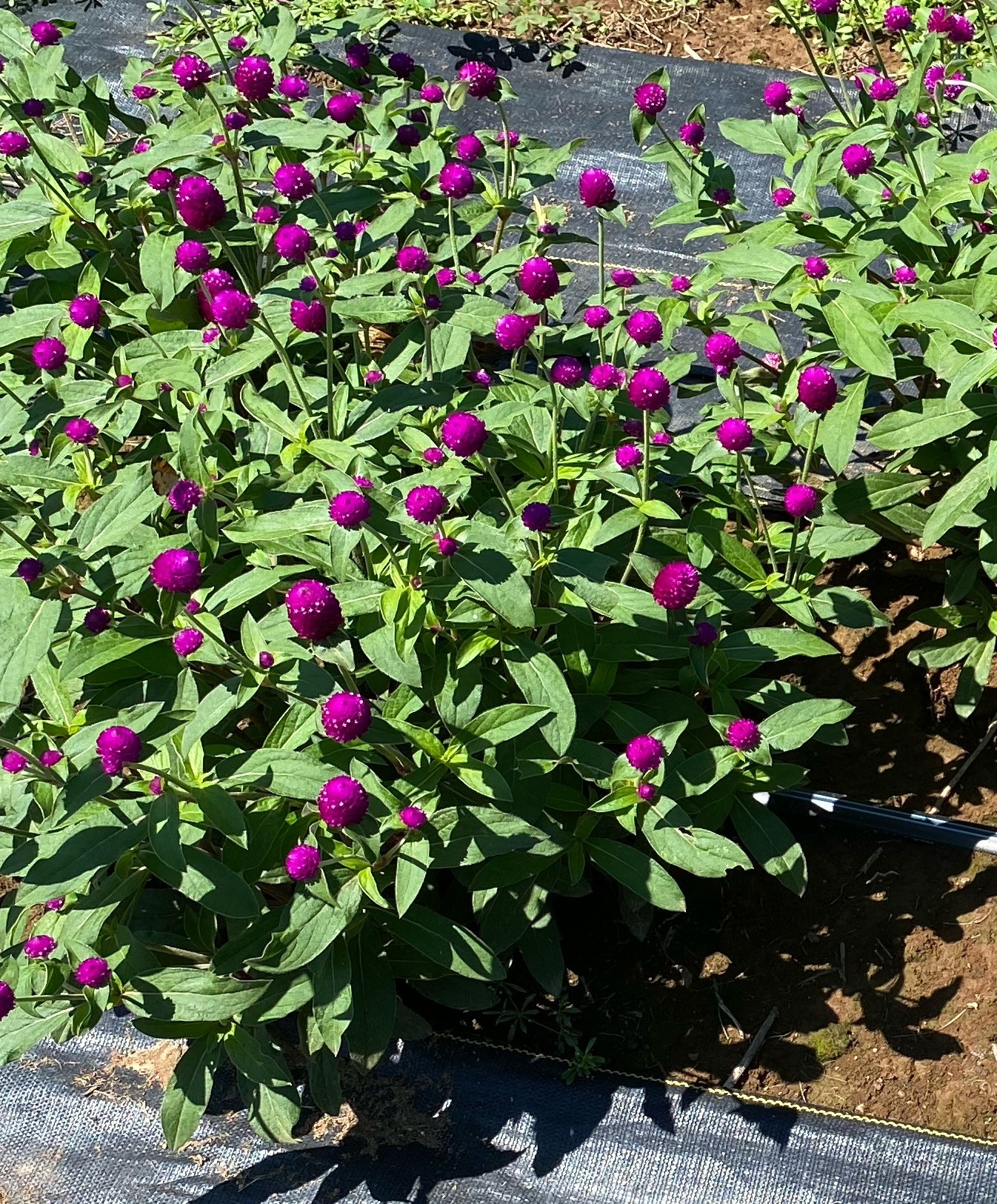
Globe amaranth – Gomphrena globosa

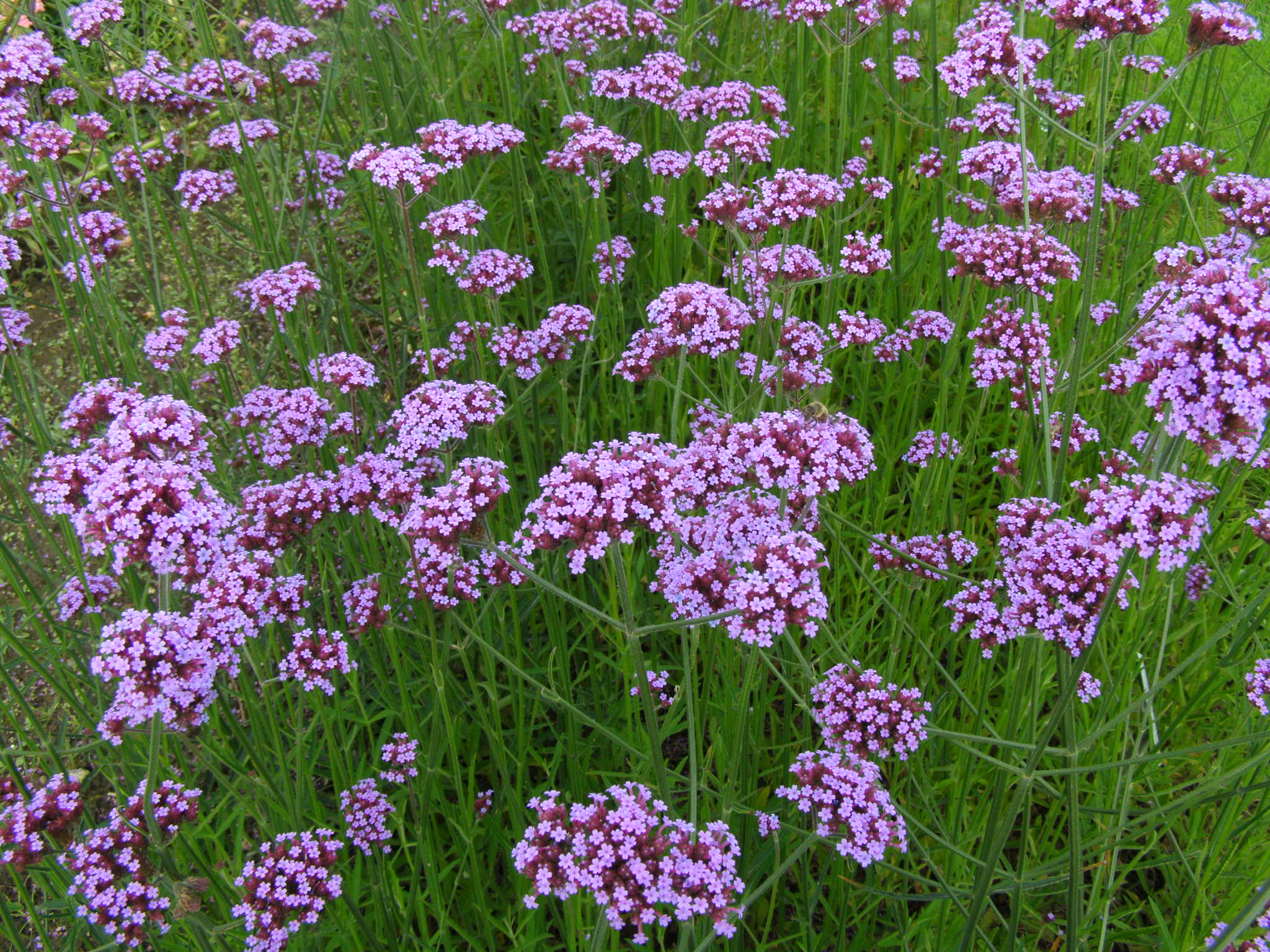
Verbena – Verbena bonariensis

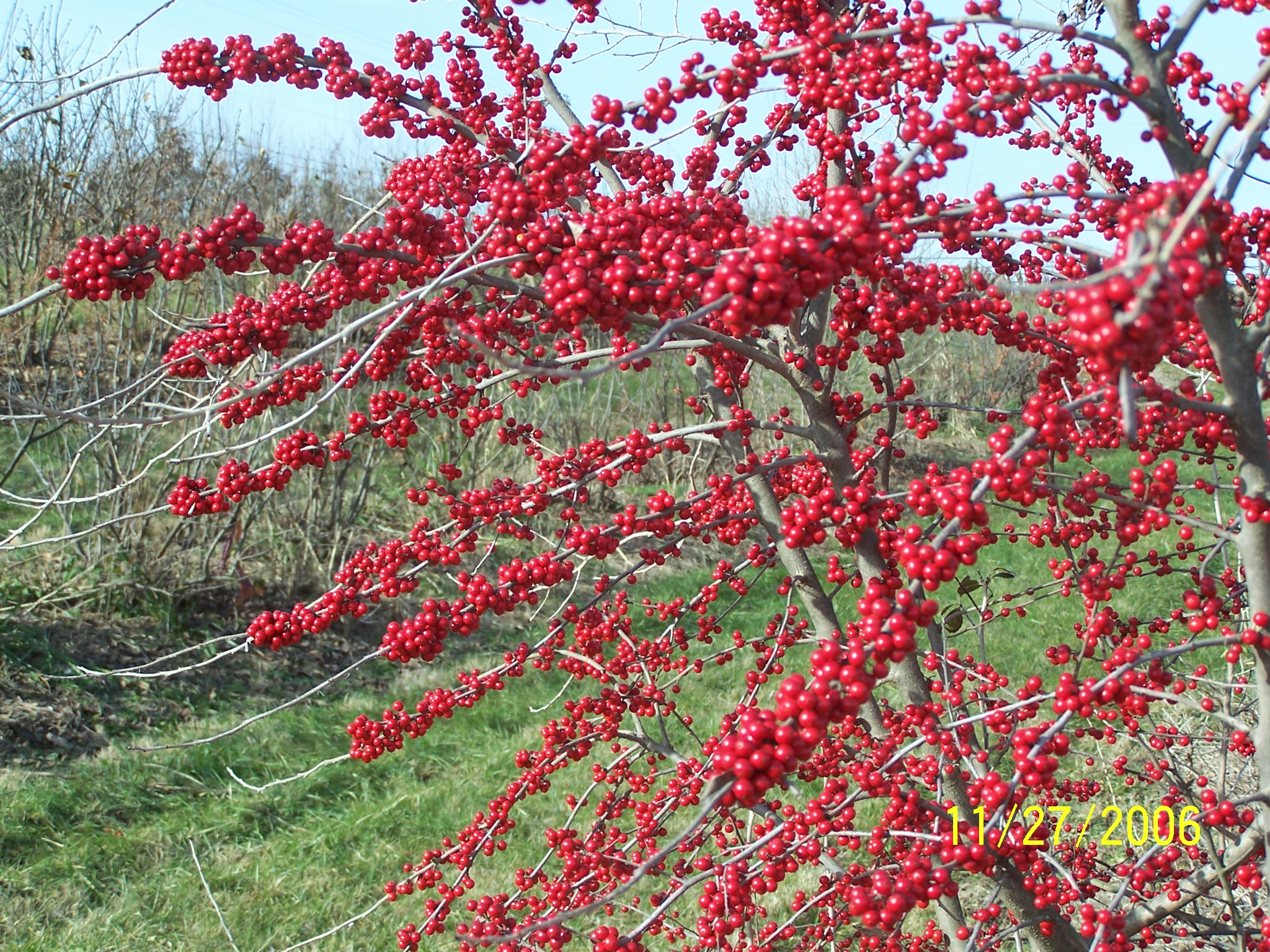
Winterberry – Ilex verticillata

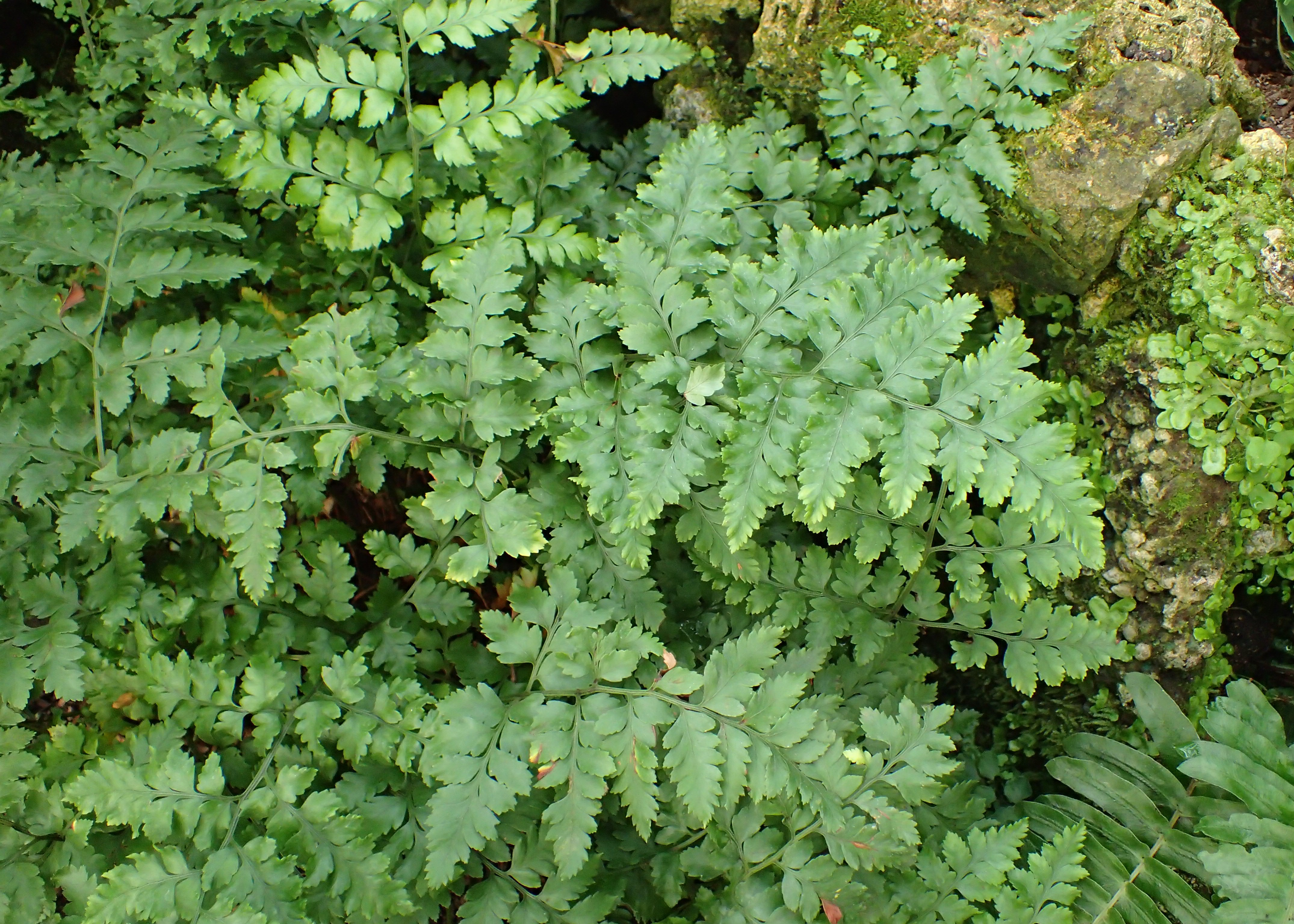
Cut Greens – Leatherleaf Fern – Rumohra adiantiformis

Others – Begonia, Ylang Ylang – Cananga odorata, Cooktown Orchid – Dendrobium bigibbum, Tasmanian Blue Gum – Eucalyptus globulus, Poinsettia – Euphorbia pulcherima, Gladiolus – Gladiolus, Gumamela – Hibiscus rosa-sinensis, Busy Lizzie – Impatiens, Lobelia – Lobelia cardinalis, Oleander – Nerium oleander, Frangipani – Plumeria rubra, Petunia, Sampaguita – Jasminum sambac, Sturt's Desert Rose – Gossypium sturtianum, Waratah – Telopia specisissima, Royal Bluebell – Wahlenbergia gloriosa

== Longevity or postharvest life ==
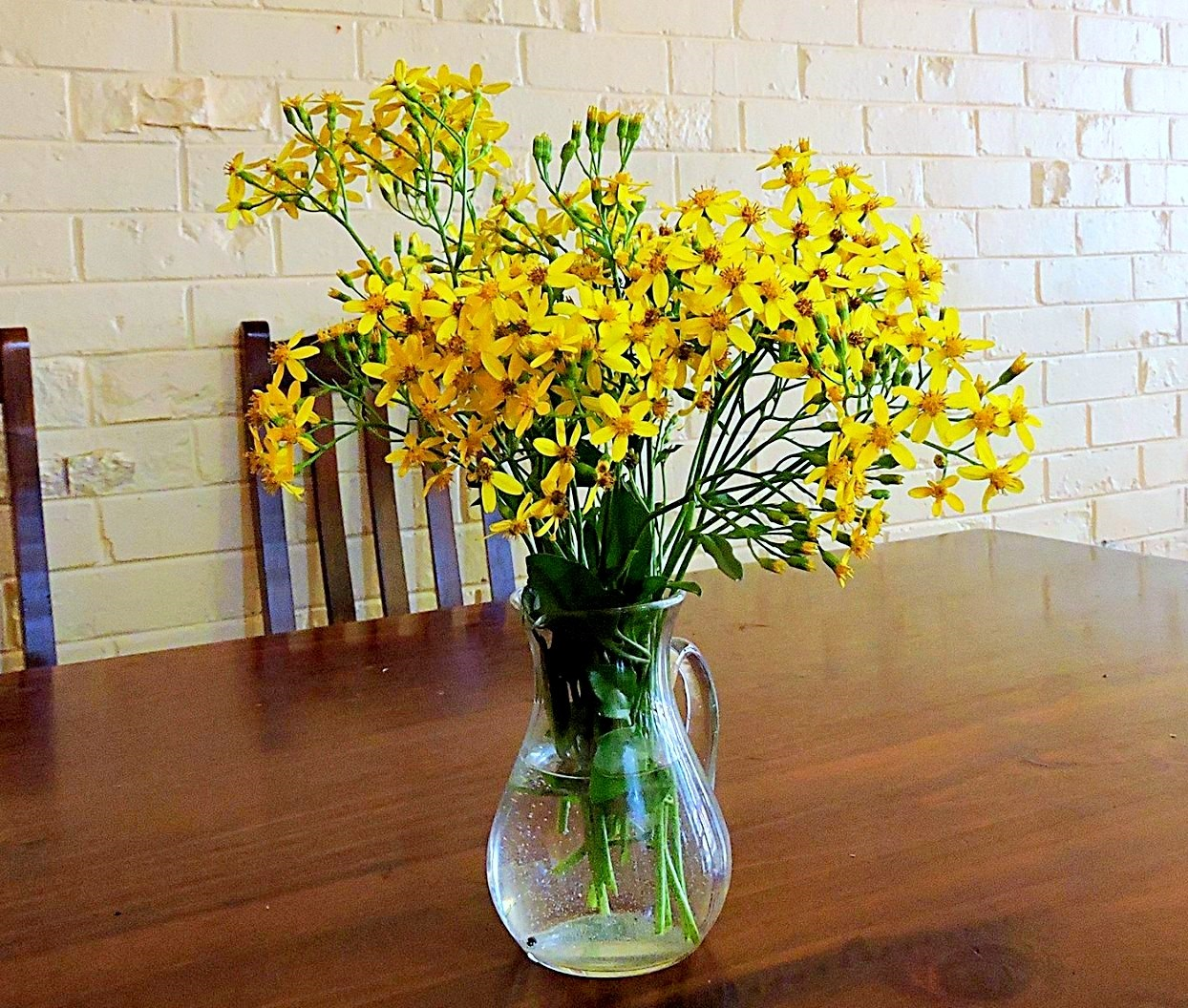
Cut flowers of Cape ivy in a vase

Flowers removed from the plant remain alive. Respiration and photosynthesis continue, but no longer have a storehouse of sugars to support them. Additionally, the flowers no longer receive water from the roots, yet transpiration continues.

In many countries, cut flowers are a local crop because of their perishable nature. In India, much of the product has a shelf life of only a day. Among these are marigold flowers for garlands and temples, which are typically harvested before dawn, and discarded after use the same day.

The postharvest life or vase life of cut flowers can be several days. The vase life of cut flowers and cut greens can be extended with thoughtful care. This care starts from the moment of harvest and continues until they are enjoyed by a flower consumer. Everyone involved must participate in the, "Floral Chain-of-Life", or the life of the cut flowers and cut greens is reduced.

Flowers are harvested in the cool part of the day, generally morning, and placed into water as soon as possible to reduce water loss from transpiration. The cut stems go into clean buckets with low pH water as a hydrating solution. Next, the cut stems are refrigerated to slow respiration, photosynthesis and transpiration. Vacuum coolers and hydrocoolers are used for large numbers of flowers on commercial farms. When cold, 2–4 °C (36–39 °F), the cut stems are sized and graded for shipment. Additionally, most or all of the leaves are removed from the cut flower stems to reduce the cost of shipping and reduce disease issues. The stems stay dry through this process to prevent disease in subsequent storage. The major cut flower types can be packaged and stored dry while other types are stored and shipped in water in a Dutch flower bucket. Boxes and pallets of the cut flowers and cut greens are shipped to a far away market, but the brokers and shippers must maintain the correct storage conditions for the flowers.

Cut flowers are conditioned upon arrival at a wholesale florist or retail florist. The flowers are removed from the shipment boxes and placed into low pH water in clean buckets to begin hydration. In the same or later step, the stems are cut under water to remove air bubbles from the xylem vessels in the stems and placed into water with a low pH for hydration and bacteria prevention, a biocide (disinfectant) to reduce bacteria and fungi in the water and a type of sugar (often sucrose) to supply energy to the developing cut flowers. The flowers may complete conditioning at room temperature or in a refrigerator depending on the cultivar. Cut flowers and cut greens are kept refrigerated during delivery to the florist or floral designer and to the consumer. Design activities occur at room temperature but floral arrangements are kept refrigerated and hydrated with the floral food solution.

Flower vase life can be affected by pre-harvest factors, such as growing conditions, genetic makeup, or post-harvest factors, such as mechanical damage, bacteria or fungi. Vase life also varies across plant species and cultivars. Cut flowers with a short vase life, of less than 5 days, include dahlias, irises, peonies, daffodils, and delphinium; flowers with a medium vase life (6 to 14 days) include marigolds, snapdragons, orchids, and roses; and flowers with a long vase life (2 to 4 weeks) include tulips, carnations, and chrysanthemums.

Chemical treatments that extend vase life are a major component of floriculture research. These include:

- Bud opening development, where buds are harvested early in development then kept in a solution of sucrose, plant hormones, and germicides before they open.
- Pulsing, where flowers are treated with increasing concentrations of sucrose for 16–20 hours at a time.
- Holding or vase solutions, which treat flowers with a mixture of carbohydrates (generally sugar), plant growth regulators, germicides, ethylene inhibitors, mineral salts, and organic acids.

=== Additives ===
The Brooklyn Botanical Garden tested different items that have been claimed to prolong the lives of cut flowers when added to the vase water. These were aspirin, sugar, vitamin pills, vinegar, pennies, and flower food. They found that the best additive for flowers was the retailer-provided "flower food" that is usually given with a bouquet. Flower foods contain an acidifier that lowers the water's pH, disinfectants, and sugar. The sugar replaces the sugar from its roots. The stem unpluggers allow the flower to continue to take up fluids. Sugar alone is almost as effective.

== Dried, preserved and everlasting flowers ==
Preserved flowers are a common use for cut flowers and some cut florist greens. Panicled hydrangea (Hydrangea paniculata), strawflower (Xerochrysum bracteatum), and lavender (Lavandula angustifolia) can be dried in a vase with no water on a table in an air conditioned kitchen. It is better hang them upside down in a dark air conditioned room; stems are straighter and colors are better. These can be used as a decoration for many months. Additional techniques – use of silica gel, micro sieve, freeze drying, etc. – are available to preserve more tender species.

== International trade ==
Cut flowers have become a part of international trade and an active economic engine in a number of tropical countries (for instance in Kenya).

Research and markets has estimated that the cut flower global market will reach a size of US$50.1 billion by 2030 from its current estimate of US$33.3 billion for 2022. Roses are projected to increase at a 5.9% compound annual growth rate, while chrysanthemum and gerbera will increase by 5.3% over the next eight years.

Royal FloraHolland in Aalsmeer, Netherlands, is the largest flower market in the world. Flowers with a value of over US$4 billion pass through the market each year. In 2019, the export value of cut flowers was €4,200 million from the EU, Colombia exports were €1,235 million, Ecuador exports were €721 million, Kenya exports were €487 million and Ethiopia exports were €180 million, while US exports were only €14 million compared to €1,052 million in imports. Union Fleur, a European international flower trade association, represents the interests of Austria, Colombia, Denmark, Ethiopia, Germany, Italy, Kenya, Netherlands, Sweden, Turkey, Uganda, and the United States. Most of Royal FloraHolland exports go to European neighbors.

Cut flower exports from China rose from US$71.4 million in 2011 to US$162.1 million in 2022, primarily from Yunnan Province where there are 300,000 farmers cultivating 1.5 million hectares of flowers. Overall production is much higher because 90% of flowers are sold in China. Most cut flowers are sold through the Dounan Flower Market in Kunming, Yunnan, China. It is likely that cut flower production in India is similar to China based on the similar population sizes.

In recent decades, with the increasing use of air freight, it has become economic for high value crops to be grown far from their point of sale; the market is usually in industrialized countries. Typical of these is the production of roses in Ecuador and carnations in Colombia, mainly for the US market, and production in Kenya and Uganda for the European market. Some countries specialize in especially high value products, such as orchids from Singapore and Thailand.

== Cultivation ==
Cut flower cultivation is intensive, usually on the basis of greenhouse monocultures, and requires large amounts of highly toxic pesticides, residues of which can often still be found in flower shops on imported flowers.

As with the production of fruit and vegetables, the industry depends on significant amounts of water, which may be collected and stored by the farm owners. The Patel Dam failure in May 2018, associated with a large Kenyan rose farm, killed dozens of people.

These facts have spurred the development of movements like "Slow Flowers", which propagates sustainable floriculture in the consumer country (US, Canada) itself.

== See also ==
- Floral industry
- Flower arrangement
- History of flower arrangement
- Bedding and garden flowers
- Houseplants
