= Floral industry =

Industry of producing, distributing, and selling flowers

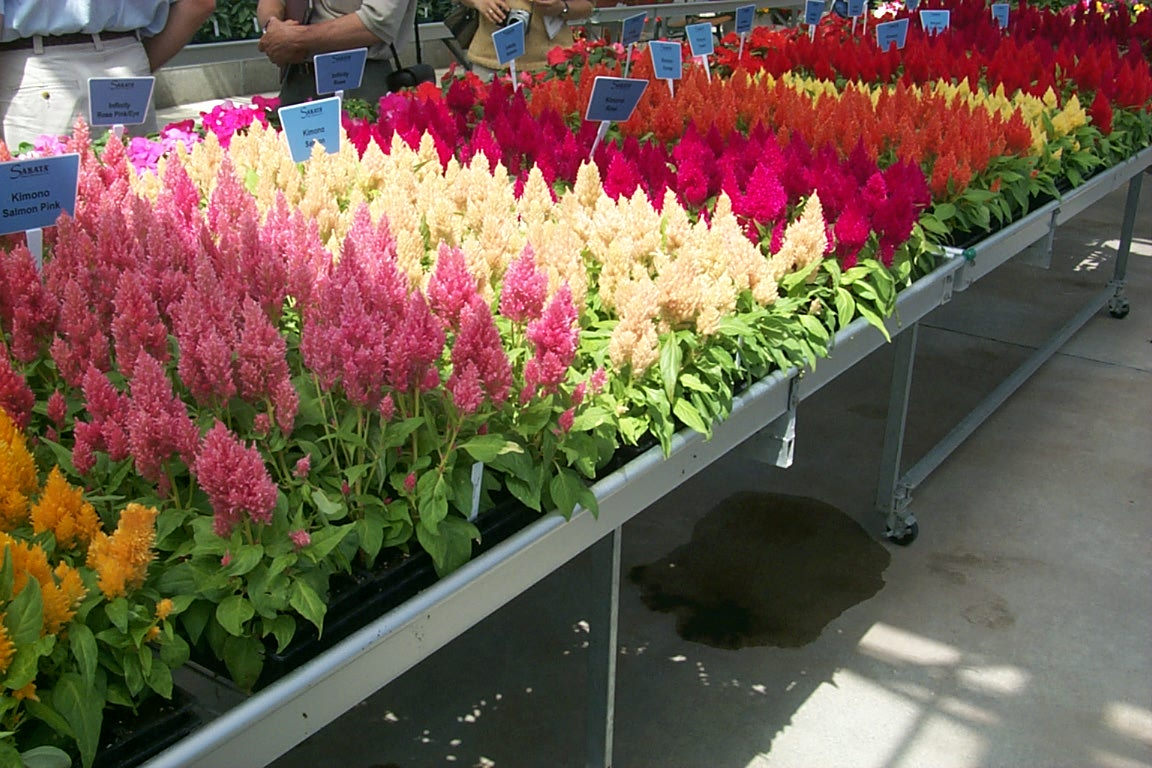
Celosia argentea 'Kimono'

The floral industry is focused on the production, distribution and sale of flowers for human enjoyment. The industry continues to diversify from the production of cut flowers to the production and sale of plants and flowers in many different forms. The global floral industry market size is estimated to be worth US$ 50040 million in 2022 and is forecast to increase to US$ 58030 million by 2028 with a compound annual growth rate of 2.5% during the review period.

For example, the US Agricultural Census identifies six categories of flowers. Most US consumers purchase flowers as a general category because plant purchases are made based on appearance and enjoyment, not by name. These groups are just for convenience, to help organize the long list of flowering plants in the floral industry. The groups are cut flowers, cut cultivated greens, annual bedding/garden plants, potted flowering plants, herbaceous perennial plants, foliage plants - indoor/patio use and propagative floriculture materials. Generally, these are garden flowers and houseplants, most produce attractive flowers, while some offer attractive foliage. Although these plants are from diverse native habitats and taxa, years of selection have found those that can be produced economically and are adaptable to the human environment.

The floral industry includes transportation companies, brokers, and wholesalers that ship the flowers from the production location to population centers around the world, where the flowers are purchased. Additionally, the floral industry includes plant breeders and companies that sell seeds, bulbs, and cuttings, and companies that sell greenhouses, pots of all kinds, potting soil, labels and marketing supplies, fertilizer, pesticides and machines for plant production activities. The service segment includes floral designers and florists, garden designers, and interior and exterior landscaping companies. Garden centers, supermarkets and hardware stores add the retail segment to the floral industry.

== Cut flowers and cut cultivated greens ==
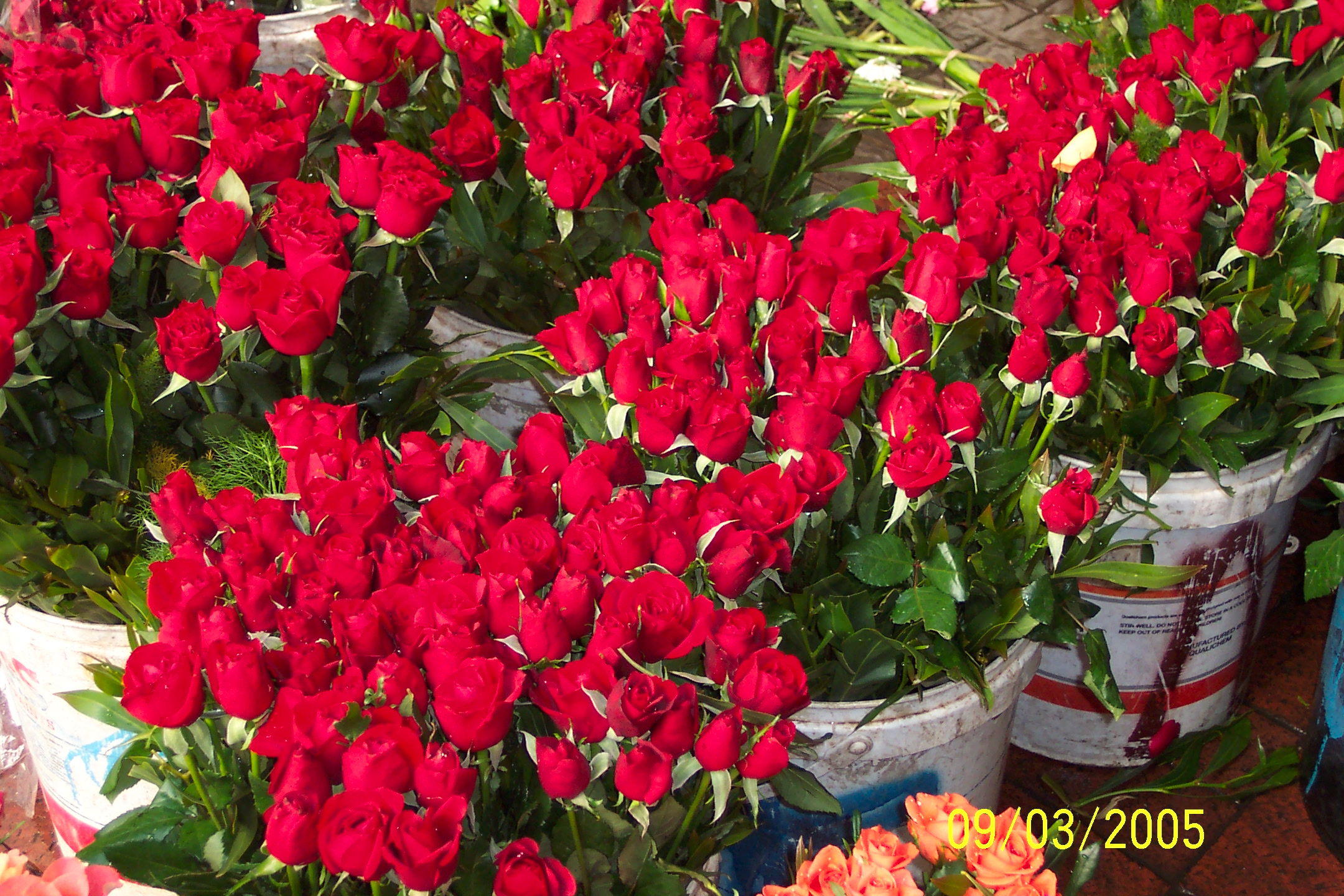
Hybrid tea rose - Rosa

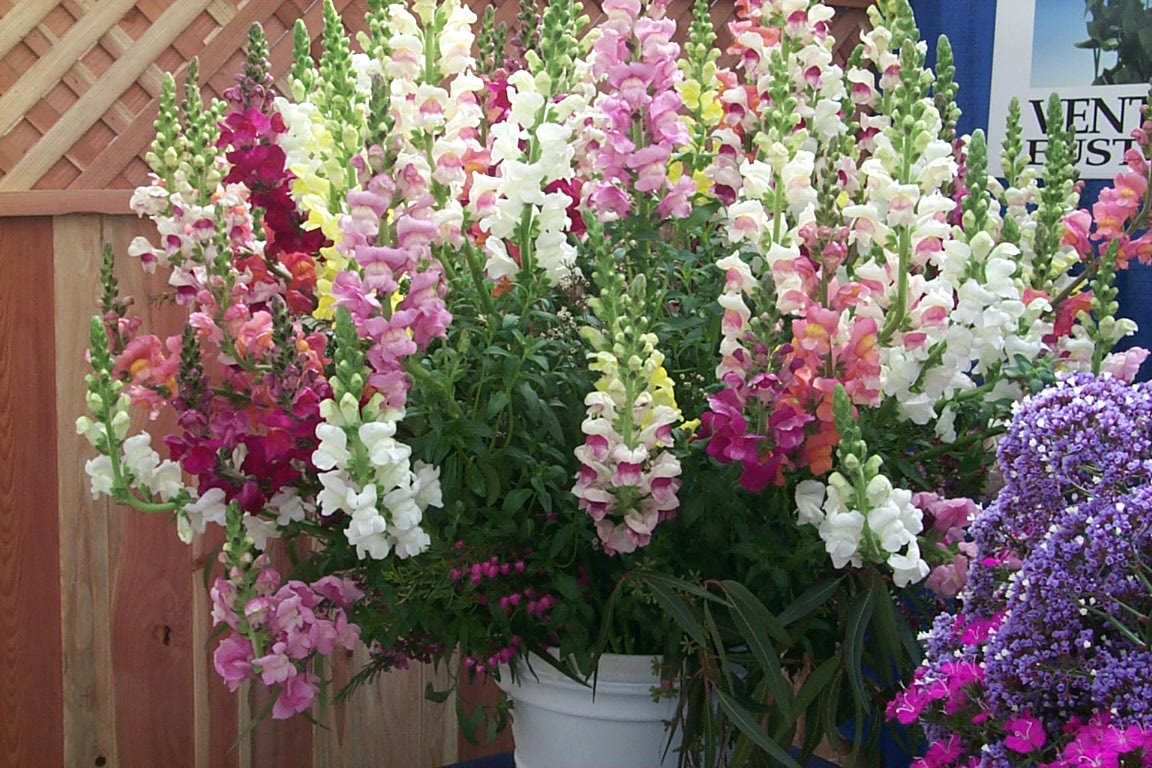
Snapdragon - Antirrhinum majus

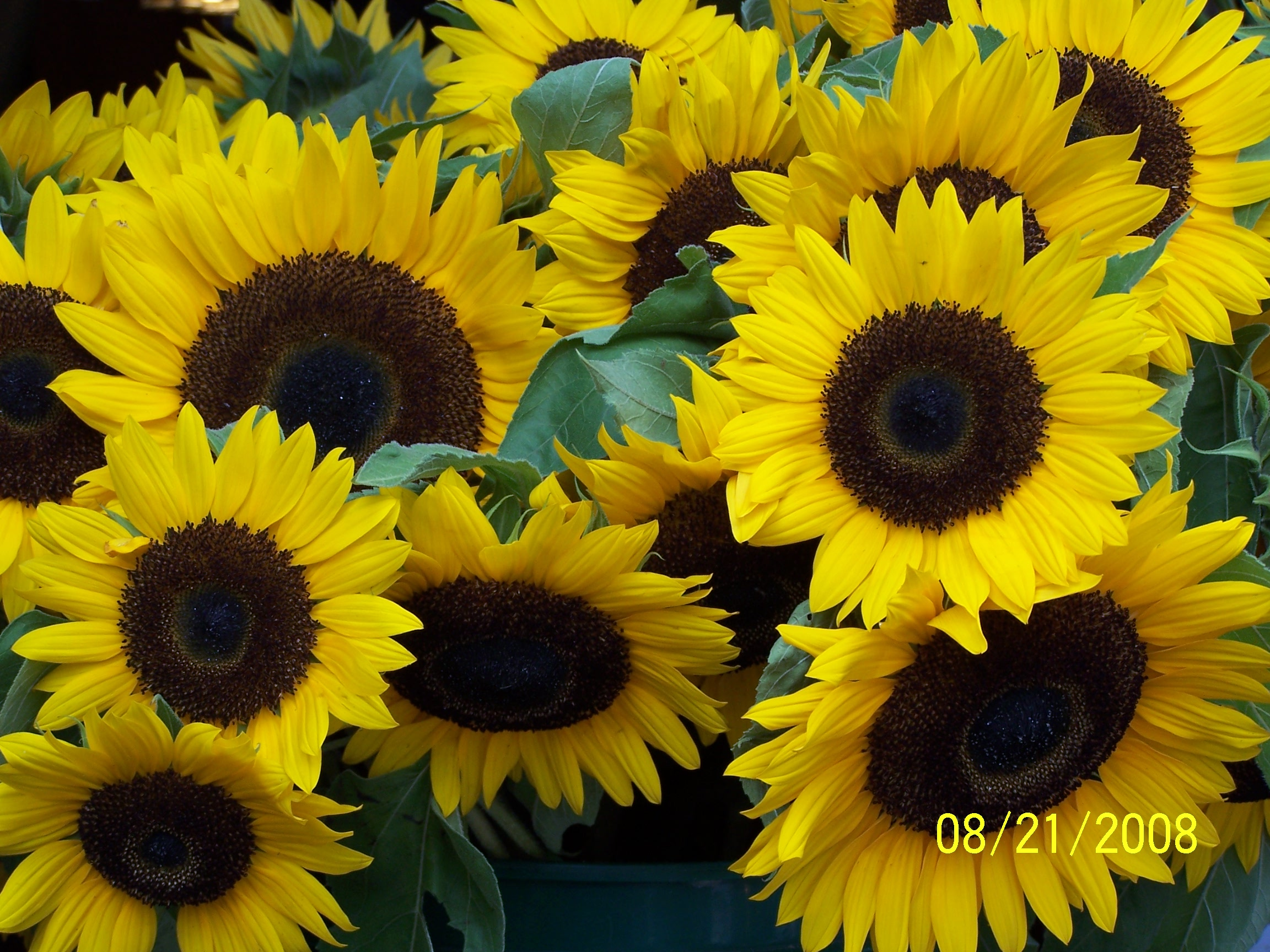
Sunflower - Helianthus annuus

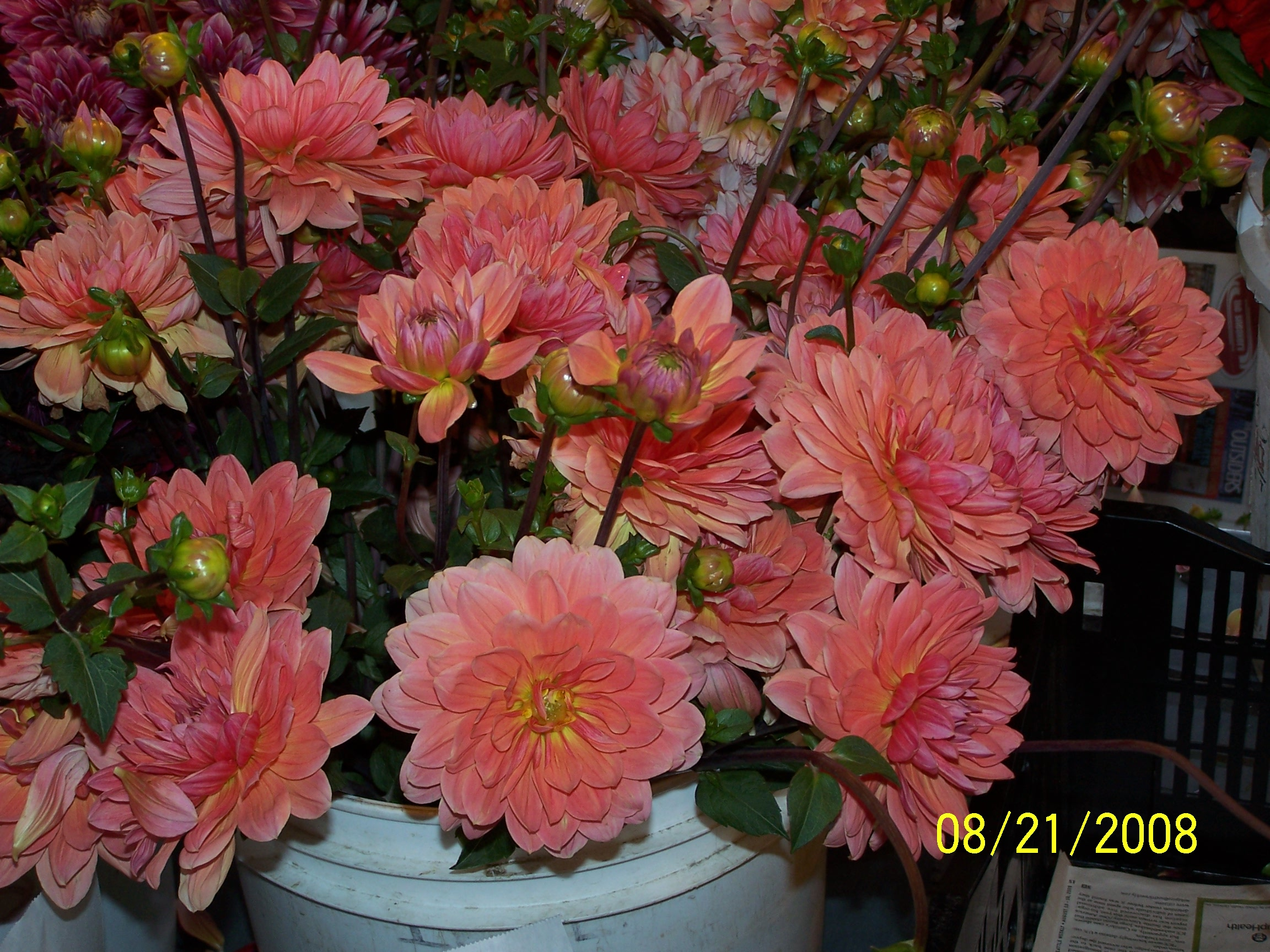
Dahlia - Dahlia pinnata

In the 1950s and 1960s, the center of cut flower production was near the largest consumers; production was local. The developed world, Japan, Western Europe and North America, were both major producers and consumers. In 2021, the world wide cut flower market is estimated at US$10.8 billion, wholesale value, based on trade statistics from 114 countries. The major importers of cut flowers, as percent of world cut flower imports, in 2021 were the United States (21%), Germany (15%), the Netherlands (12.5%), the United Kingdom (9.4%), Russia (5%), France (4.6%).

=== Ottoman Empire and the Netherlands ===
The Tulip was a wild flower growing in Central Asia when it was first cultivated by the Turks as early as 1000 AD. Mania in Turkey struck in the 16th century, at the time of the Ottoman Empire, when the Sultan demanded cultivation of particular blooms for his pleasure. Tulips became popular garden plants in the east and west, but, whereas the tulip in Turkish culture was a symbol of paradise on earth and had almost a divine status, in the Netherlands, it represented the briefness of life.

The Netherlands remains the center of production for the European floral market, as well as a major international supplier to other continents. The flower auction at Royal FloraHolland is the largest flower market in the world. Since the mid-1970s, the production and distribution of cut flowers in the Netherlands has burgeoned. Billions of cut flowers are shipped to the Netherlands every year to be sold at auction followed by immediate transport to buyers around the world.

=== New flower growing centers ===
Experts believe that the production focus has moved from traditional growers to countries where the climates are better and production and labor costs are lower. This has resulted in a paradigm shift in the floral industry. The Netherlands, for instance, has already shifted attention from flower production to flower trading, though it plays an important role still in the development of flower genetics. The new centers of production are developing countries like Ecuador (largest producer and exporter of roses worldwide), Colombia (second largest exporter in the world and with a market more than 40 years old), Ethiopia, Kenya, and India. Other players in this global industry are Mexico, Israel, South Africa, Australia, Thailand and Malaysia. New Zealand, due to its position in the Southern Hemisphere, is a common source for seasonal flowers that are typically unavailable in Europe and the United States.

In Africa, Kenya is the largest exporter, supplying a significant percentage of Europe's flowers. The industry there is represented by the Kenya Flower Council. In North America, Mexico dedicated the third biggest land area in the world in 2019 (22,700 hectares ~ 56,092 acres, and growing) to the production of ornamental flowers. Despite that, only 5% of the total flower production is currently being exported, mostly to the United States, Canada, and Europe. However, the high technological development in most flower production centers, like Villa Guerrero, State of Mexico, make possible a world-class quality in flower production. The floral industry in Mexico, is represented at a national level by the Consejo Mexicano de la Flor (in English, Mexican Flower Council) but there are numerous organizations of flower growers of state and regional scope. The Asociación de Floricultores de Villa Guerrero A.C. (in English, Flower Growers Association of Villa Guerrero A.C.) internationally recognized by its acronym ASFLORVI, had a record of more than 700 flower grower members in 2019, making it the biggest flower grower association of Mexico. Mexico offers several advantages for flower companies in the United States and Canada in comparison to many already well known flower production countries like Colombia and Ecuador. Perhaps, the biggest advantage is that the most important centers of massive flower production in Mexico, like Villa Guerrero (today known as Capital of the Flower in Mexico) are at only 653 miles, or approximately 13 hours driving from Laredo, Texas. This facilitates the all-season production of flowers from Mexico, to be sent by highway to the United States, and that represents a significant logistical advantage for American and Canadian flower companies that import flowers from remote regions of the world, relying exclusively on pricier aircraft transportation. Moreover, the currently underused Toluca International Airport is located at a highway distance of just 69.00 km (~ 42.87 mi) or one hour driving from Mexico's Flower Capital, making it yet a more competitive air freight option for the Canadian and American flower markets than any other flower growing country in the world. Since Mexico has already a free trade agreement with these nations (the USMCA), this could potentially be an opportunity for Mexico to step up as the main flower exporter to the United States, and Canada. Furthermore, Mexican illegal plantations of opium, marihuana, and coca are grown in lands that meet all the environmental conditions for ornamental flower growing, making it a valuable opportunity for the Mexican government to incentivize flower growing productive projects for poor Mexican farmers, who most of the time grow illegal crops as their only alternative to subsist. This would allow Mexico to address some of the main causes of its illegal narcotic production and possibly reduce the rampant violence of the Mexican drug war.

In South America, Colombia is the leading cut flower producer and exporter accounting for 59% of all flowers imported to The United States in 2006. The United States imports 82% of its cut flowers. Growers in the United States state that 3 out of 4 flowers in the United States are grown outside the US with Colombia being the biggest exporter. The United States signed a free trade agreement with Colombia and that has lowered the cost of Colombian flowers in the United States. Ecuador has become, in recent years, the leading South American rose producer and is well-known throughout the world for its high quality, large headed roses due to the high altitude location of its rose farms.

== Annual bedding/garden plants ==
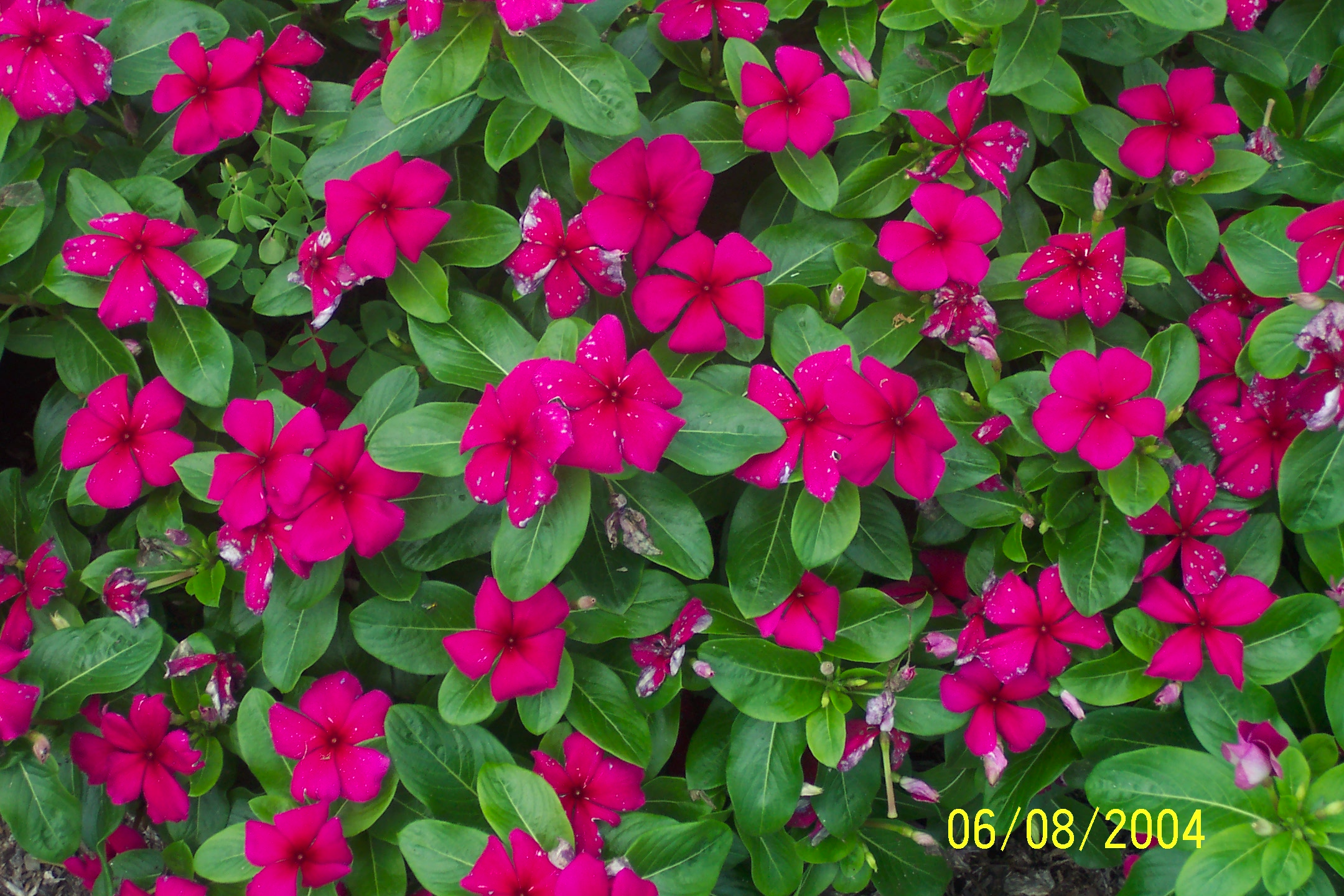
Vinca - Catharanthus roseus 'Titan Burgundy'

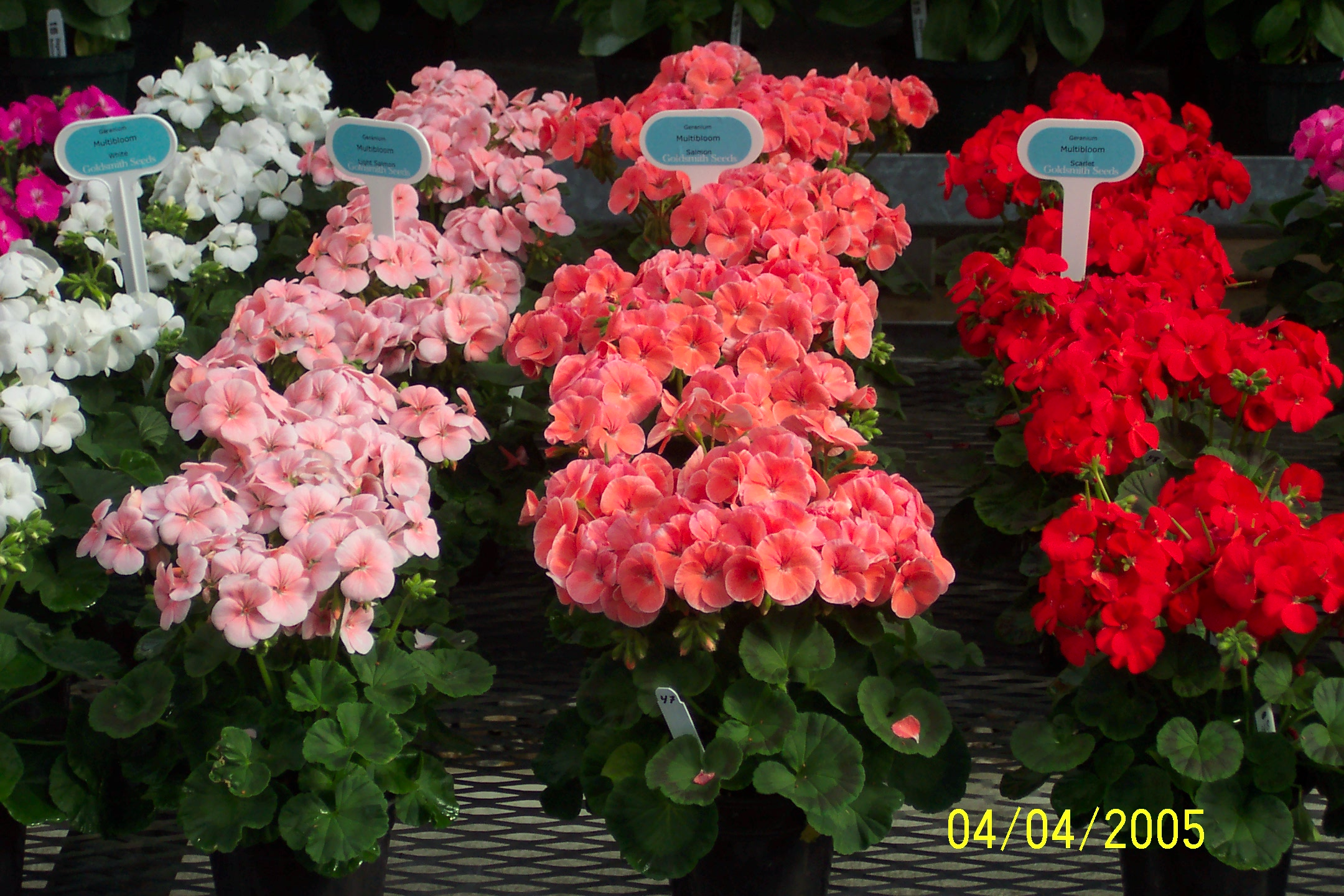
Geranium - Pelargonium x hortorum 'Multibloom'

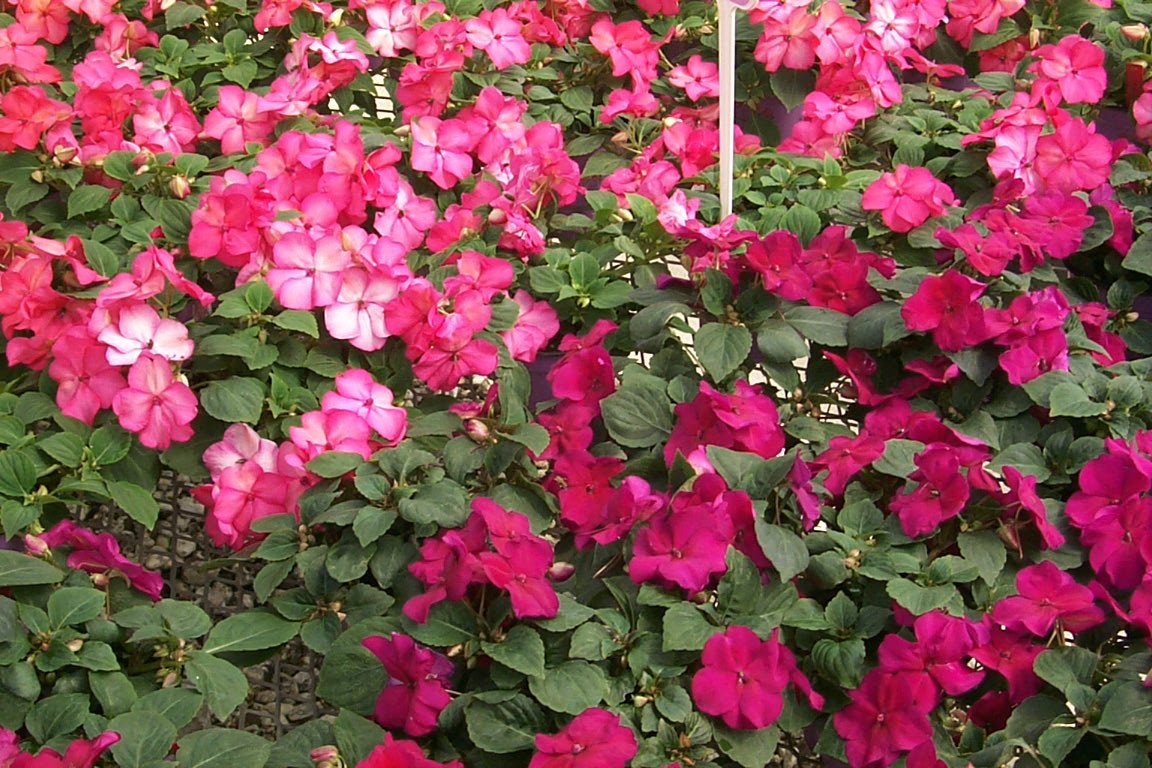
Impatiens, Busy Lizzie - Impatiens wallerana

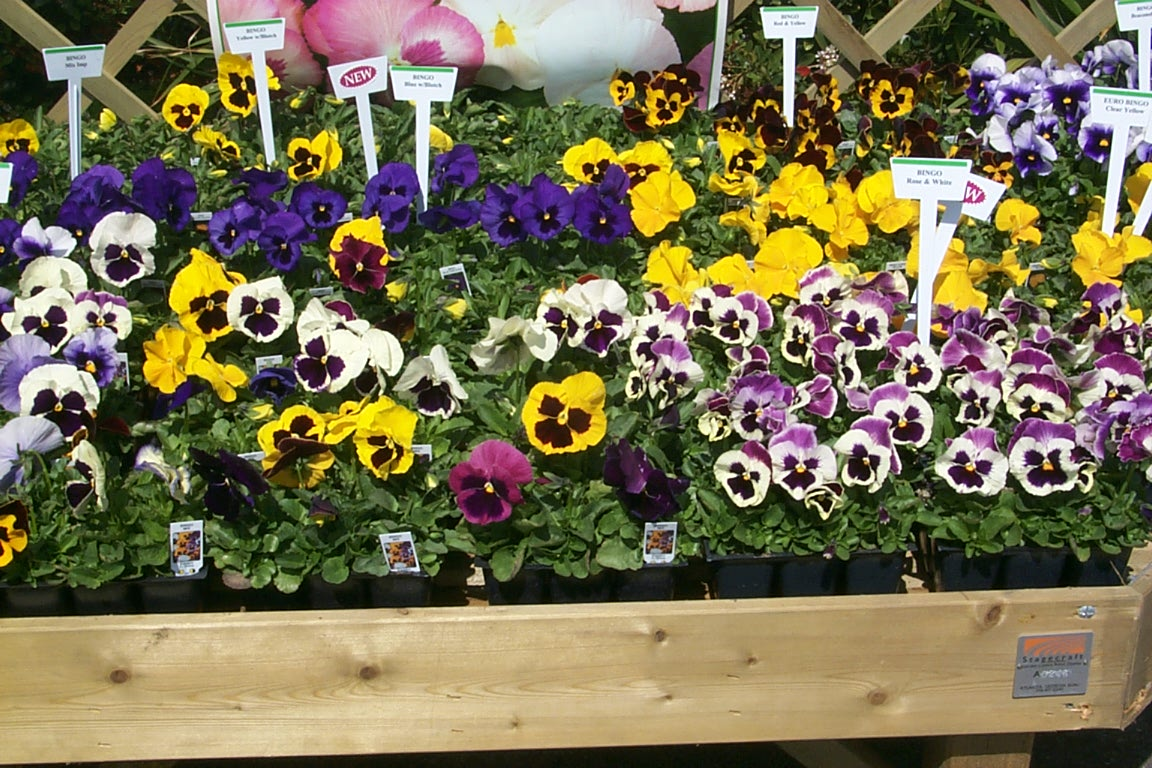
Pansy - Viola x wittrockiana

Traditionally, the flowering plants in this group are planted for public and personal display in garden beds in municipal parks, outside public buildings and in many personal landscapes. As time has passed, it is common to see these plants in various types of container gardens, on public plazas or patios and porches around the world. These plants are used for seasonal gardens, spring, summer, fall or winter, depending on the climate where the garden is located. Some plants perform best in cool weather (even frost tolerant) and others need the summer heat for best performance. Some are annuals in nature, others are perennial in their natural habitat, but may be treated as annuals in a seasonal garden. In the past, it was common for these plants to be grown from seed and sold at a small size in 5 cm (2 inch), approximately, pots or packs. Plant and pot size have increased in the last 20 years and many cultivars are now grown from cuttings. Vegetable transplants, from seed, are sold in small to large pots and are included in this group.

The production of bedding plants remains local. Most governments have pest quarantines that prevent the shipment of plants in potting soil between countries. These rules protect all of agriculture from major disease and insect pests.

In the US, bedding plants are the top selling group of flowers with nearly 40% of total sales, nearly US$2.5 billion, wholesale value, in 2022. This group of plants has significant sales in many countries because they are locally produced.

== Potted flowering plants ==
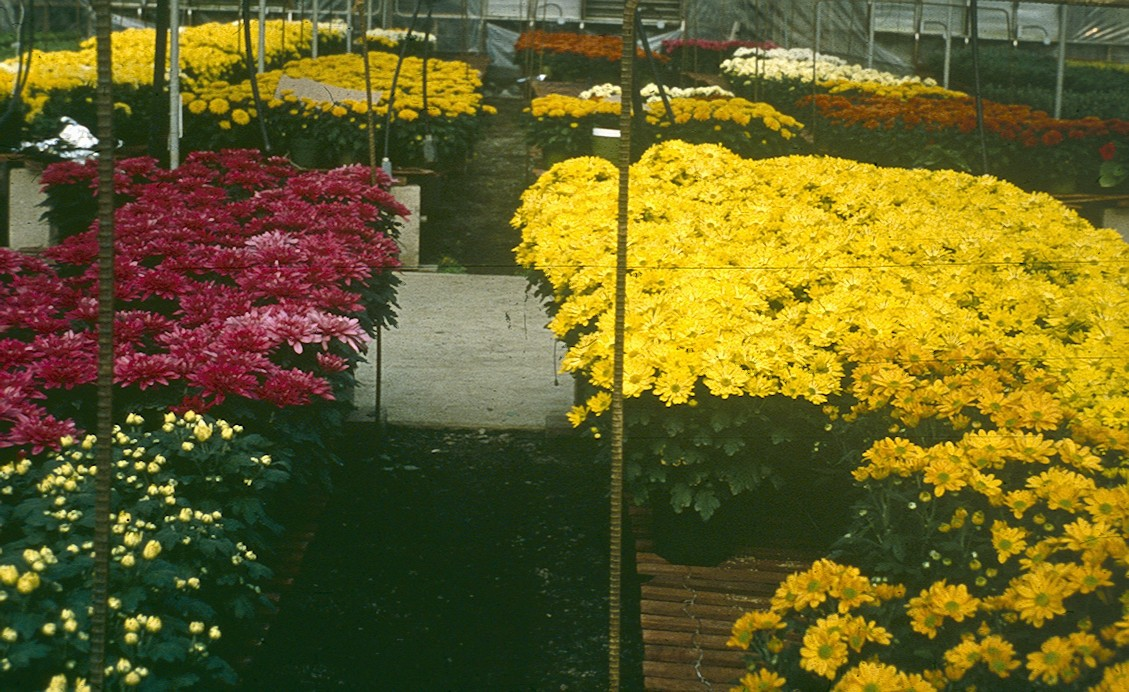
Pot mum - Chrysanthemum x morifolium

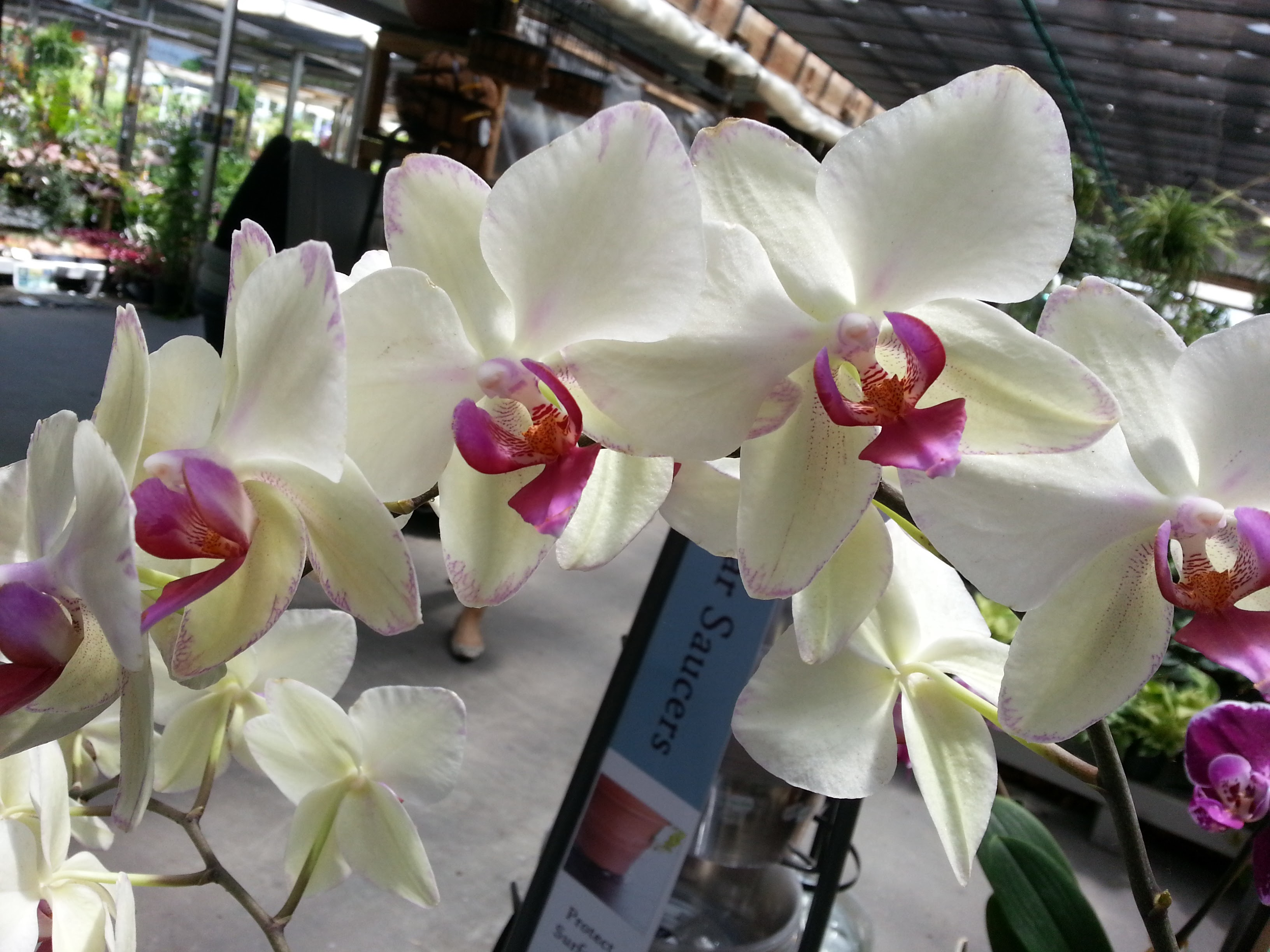
Moth orchid - Phalaenopsis

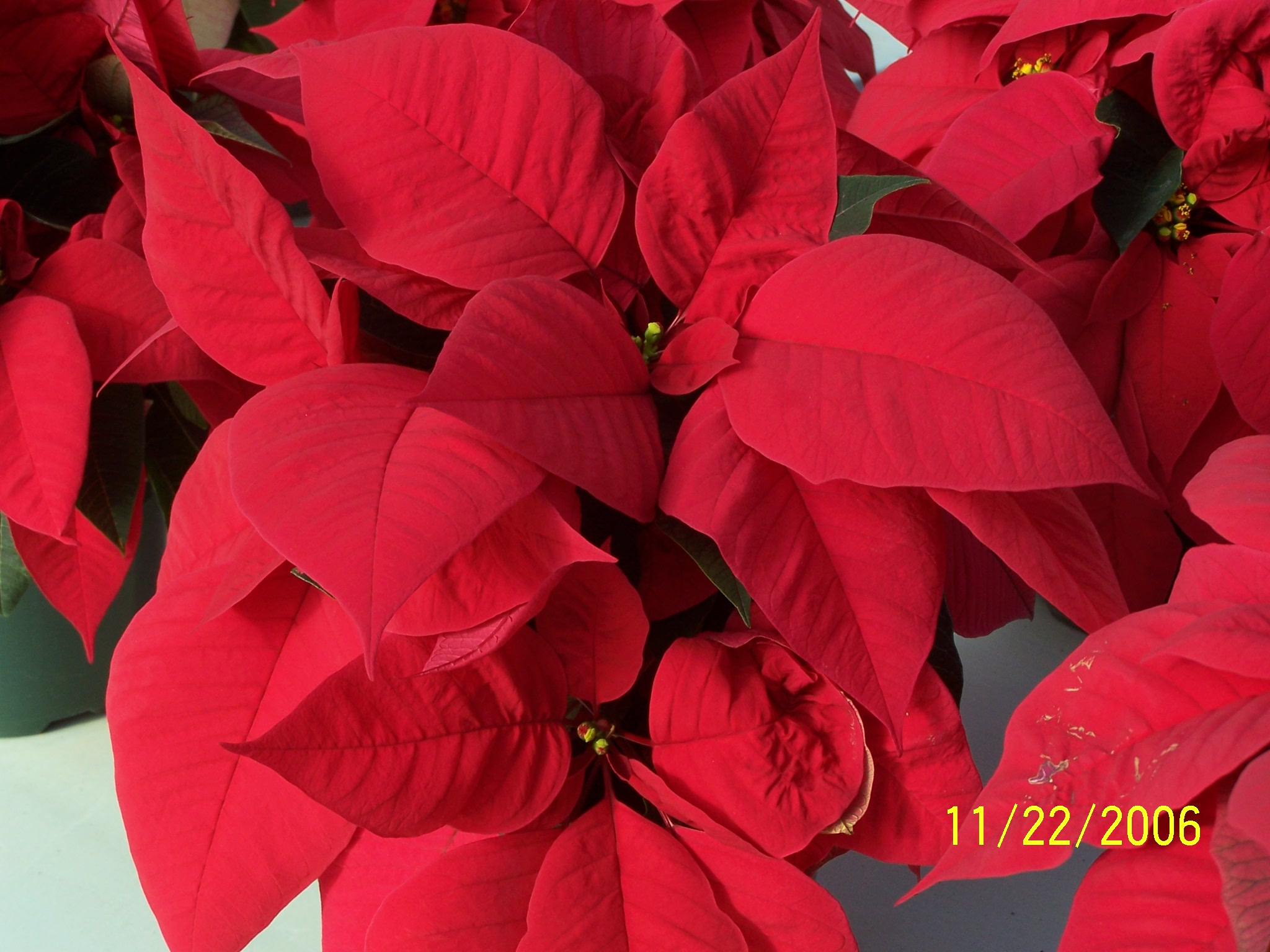
Poinsettia - Euphorbia pulcherrima 'Premium Red'

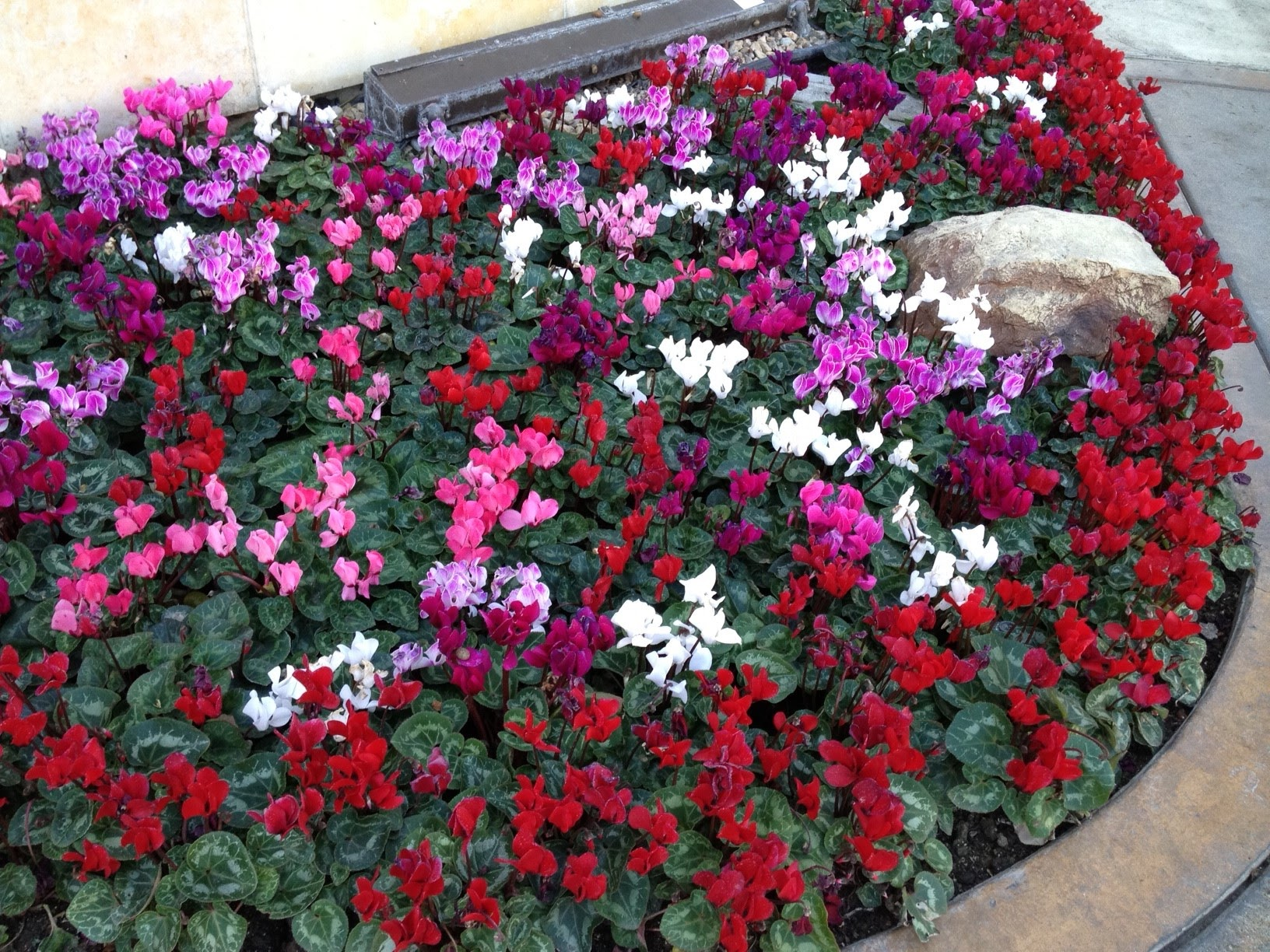
Cyclamen - Cyclamen persicum

This group of flowering plants add beauty and tradition to holidays - poinsettias at Christmas, Easter lilies, potted roses for Mothers' Day, etc. These plants are usually kept indoors as houseplants or as part of interior landscape displays. The plants are grown in pots, usually 15 cm (6 inches) pot diameter or 4 L (1 gallon) by volume, larger and smaller pots are also used. Pots of orchids, mums, Reiger begonias, roses, African violets, gerberas, and kalanchoes are available most of the year, poinsettias and Christmas cactus are available in November and December, cyclamen are available all winter and spring, hydrangea, rhododendron, and spring flowering bulbs - tulips, daffodils, hyacinths, etc. - are common in the spring. These plants are more difficult to ship long distance due to the weight plus the plant quarantine regulations may preclude shipment to other nations. Like bedding plants, these plants are, primarily, grown locally in most countries. These plants had a wholesale value in the US of nearly US$1.1 billion in 2022.

== Foliage plants - indoor/patio use ==
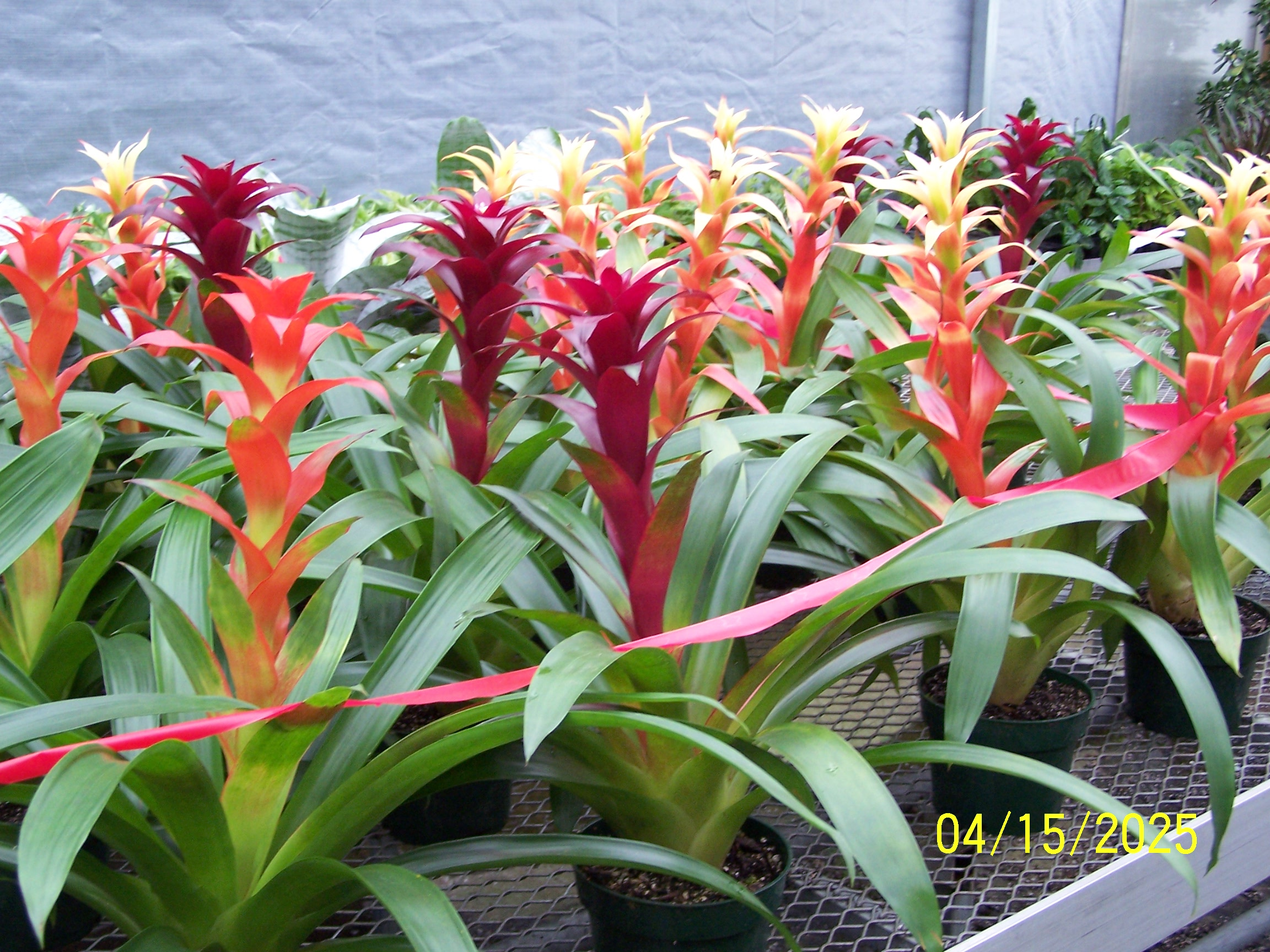
Guzmania - Guzmania lingulata

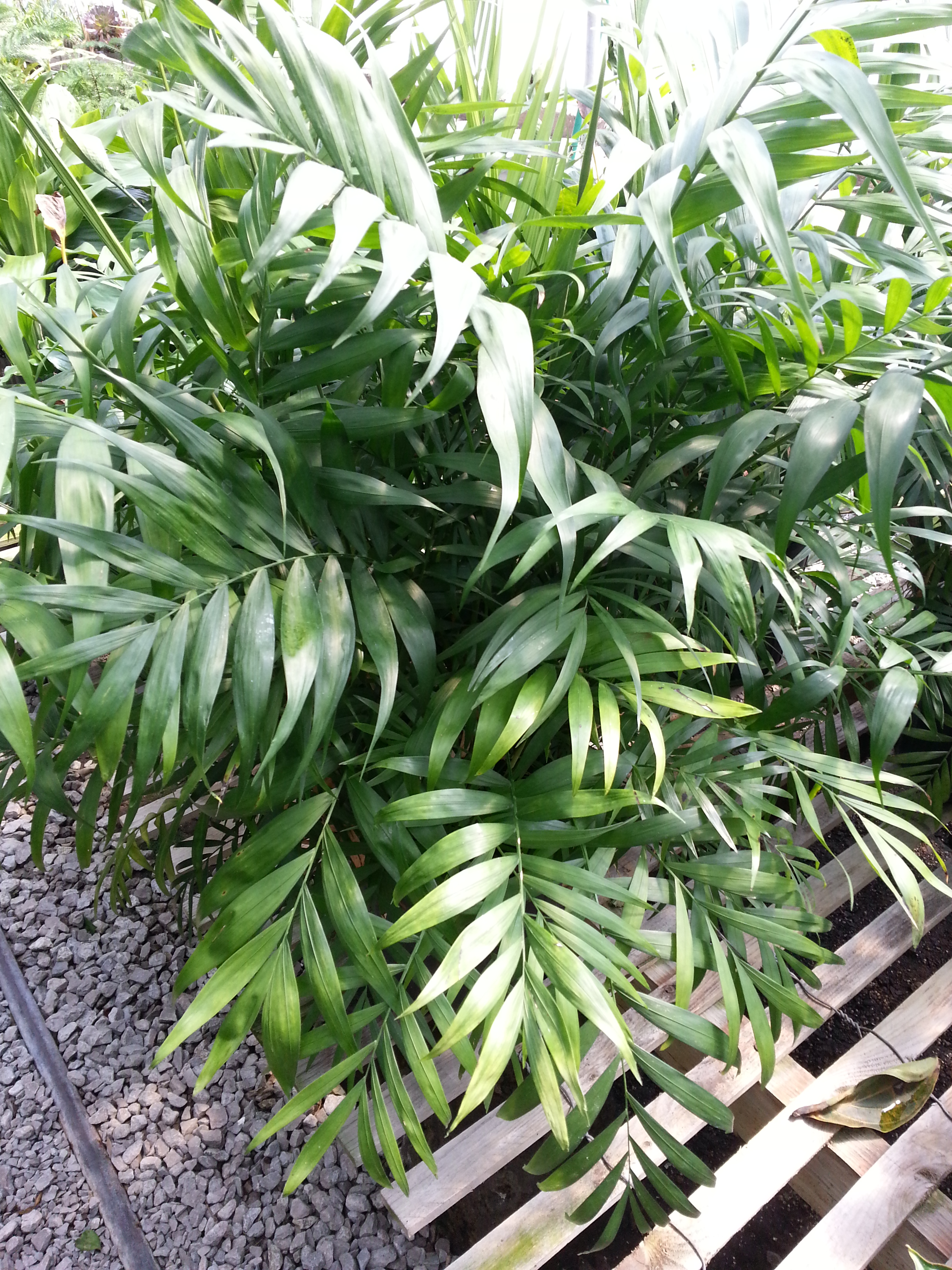
Neanthe bella palm - Chamaedorea elegans

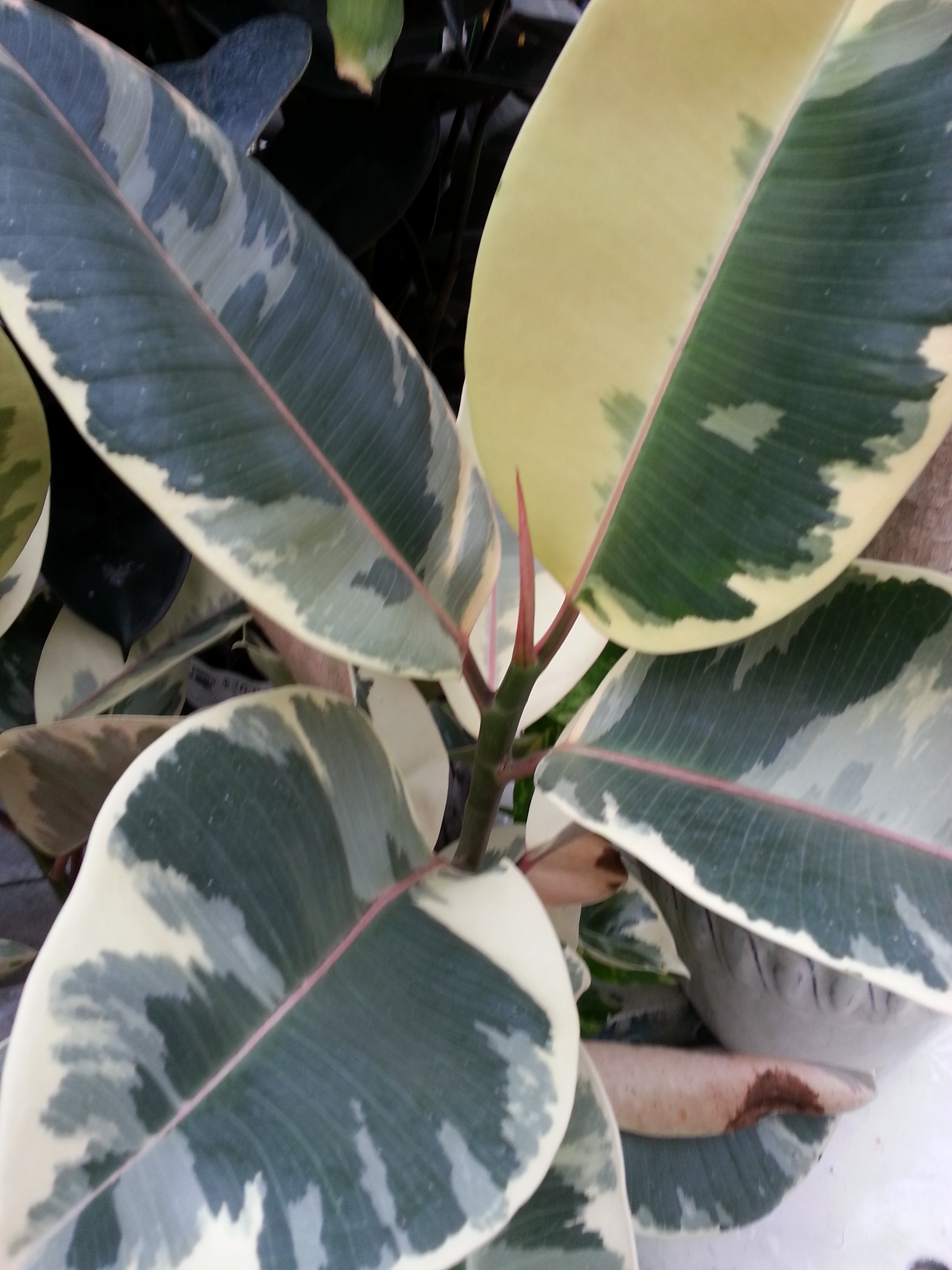
Rubber tree - Ficus elastica 'Doescheri'

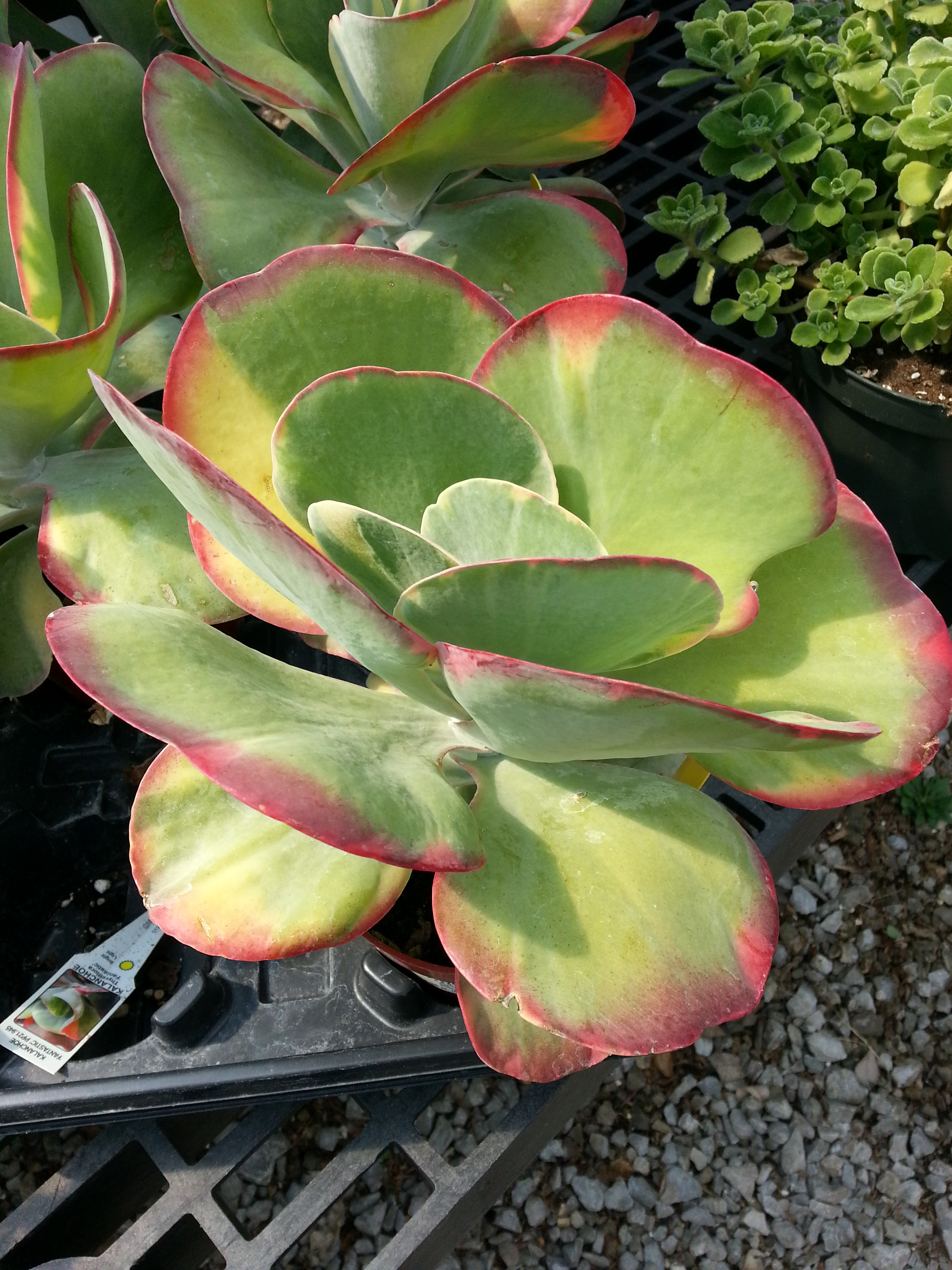
Flapjacks - Kalanchoe luciae

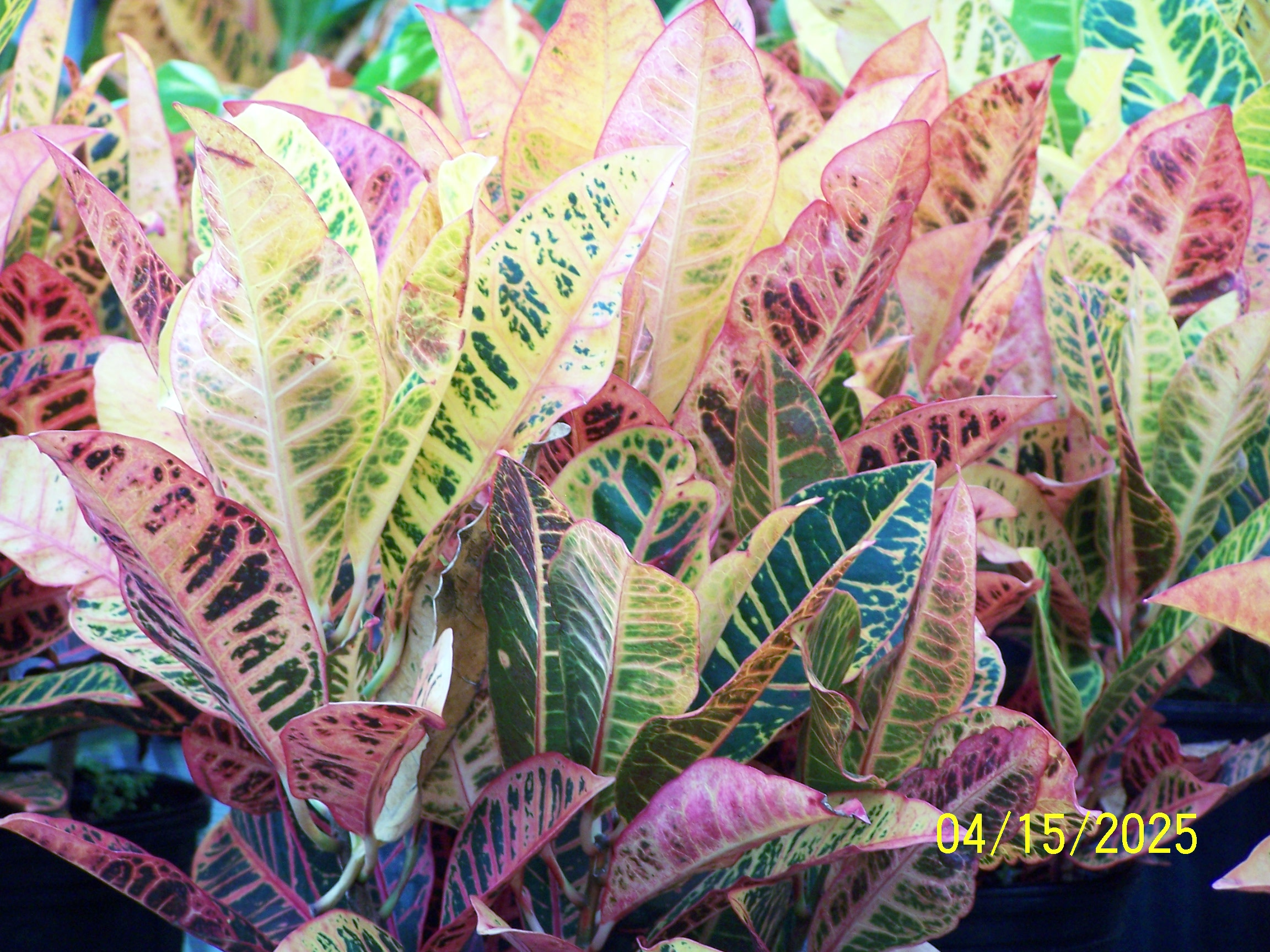
Croton - Codiaeum variegatum 'Petra'

Most people would say foliage plants are houseplants. This is true, however, the industry calls this group foliage plants. There are hundreds of species and thousands of cultivars of plants that can be grown inside and outside of the home. Most of these house-plants are exterior landscape plants in tropical and subtropical climates. They are grown for their striking appearance from color patterns in the leaves or colorful flowers. Over the past 300+ years, plant fanciers have found these plants in tropical and subtropical areas, found they were relatively easy to propagate and found they could survive in the human environment. Even though they may grow in full sunlight naturally, many can tolerate lower light levels indoors. Even though they do not grow in containers naturally, they will tolerate a small space for their root system. Even though they may have evolved in a humid climate, they can tolerate the low humidity of the human environment. The foliage plants that are most tolerant of the human environment are the most successful houseplants in the floral industry.

== Herbaceous perennial plants ==
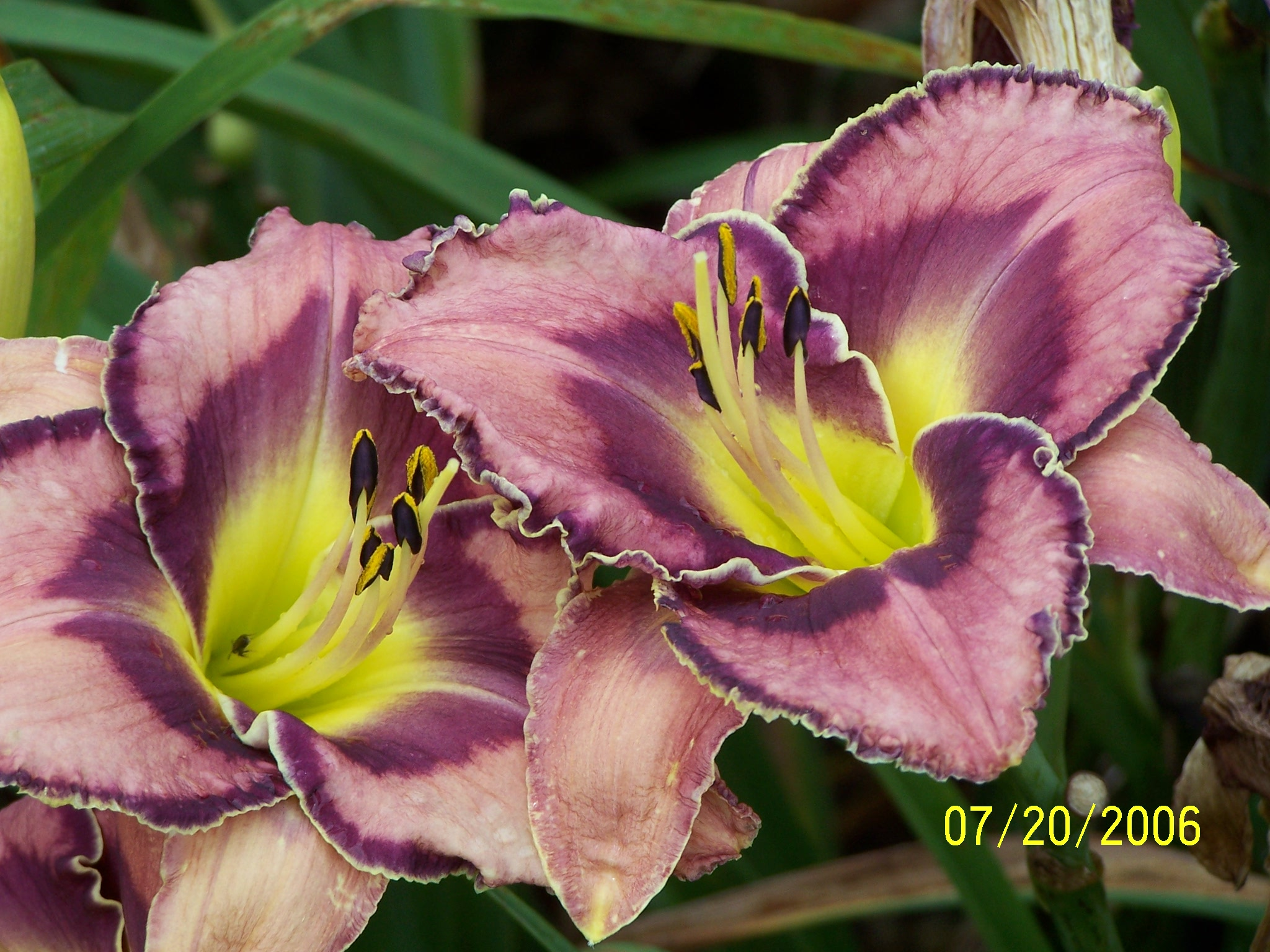
Daylily - Hemerocallis

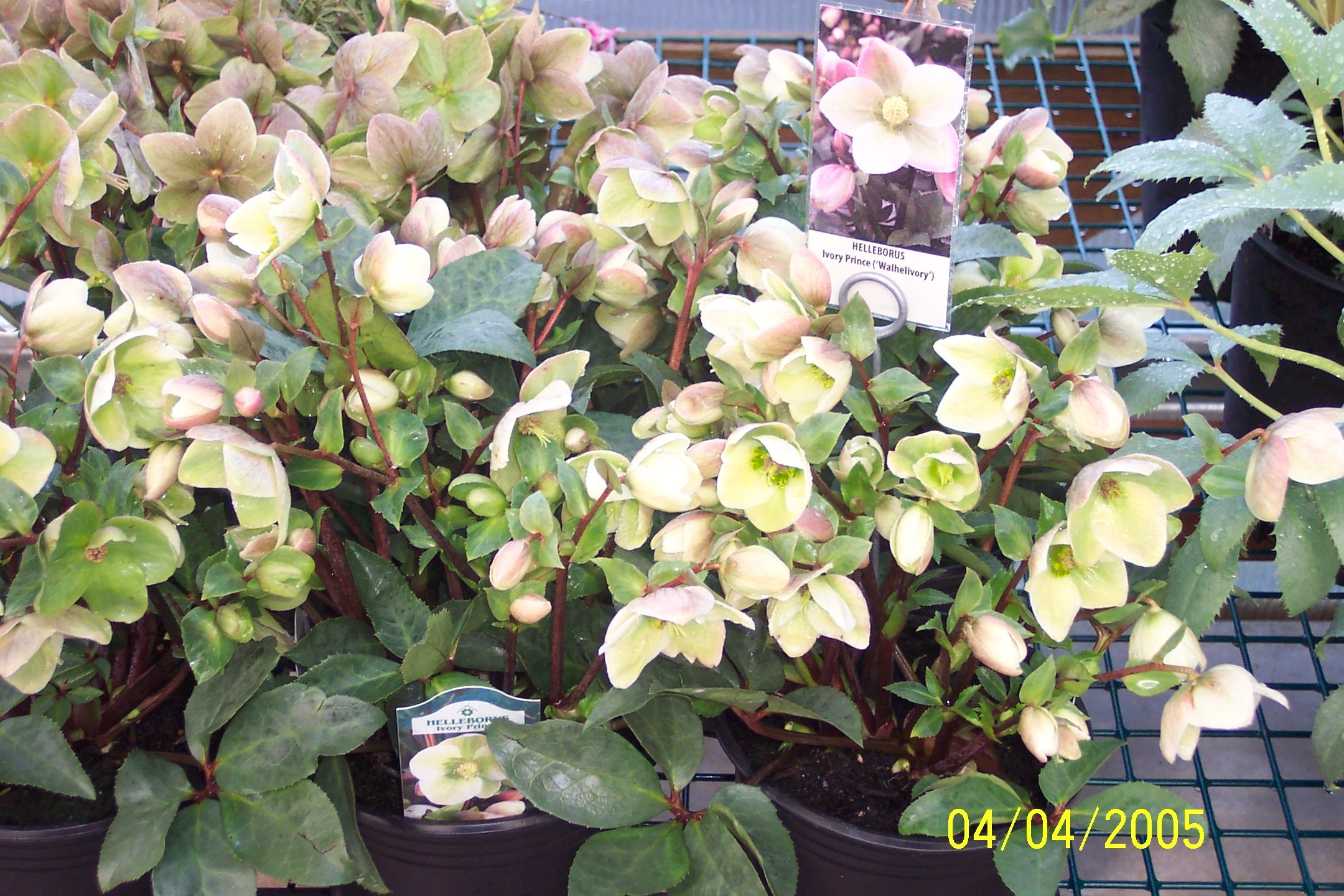
Lenten rose - Helleborus

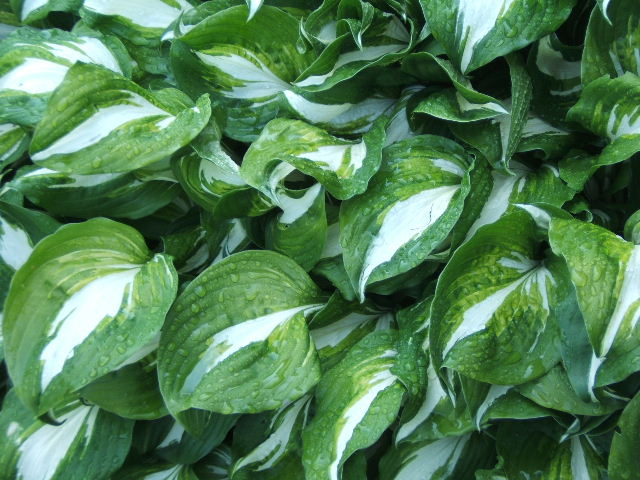
Hosta - Hosta 'Undulata'

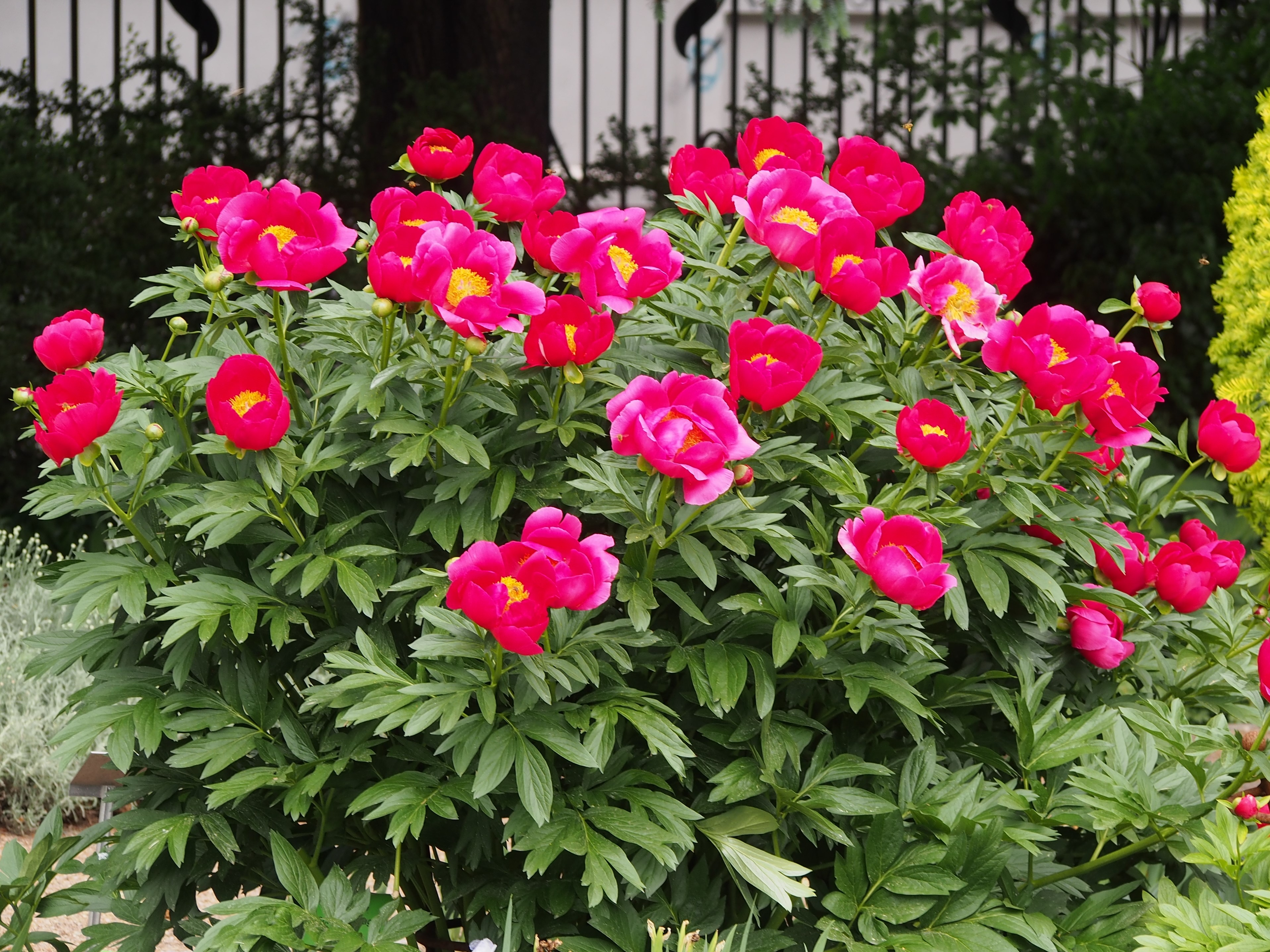
Peony - Paeonia lactiflora 'Scarlet Tananger'

Back to the common flower garden plants for this group, herbaceous perennial plants. These plants are perennial, they come back every year in their optimal climate range. The plants are relatively permanent in the flower garden but the flowers will occur for only 2–6 weeks each year. The gardening strategy (herbaceous perennial border) is to mix the plants so that there are plants flowering spots of color, throughout the garden, throughout the seasons. This is relatively easy to do in cool temperate climates, such as northern Europe or in New England states of the US, but difficult in southern Europe, regions of India or Texas in the southern US. However, many herbaceous perennials have been selected from the southern US flora since 1990, so perennials are a significant group of the floral industry.

== Propagative floriculture materials ==
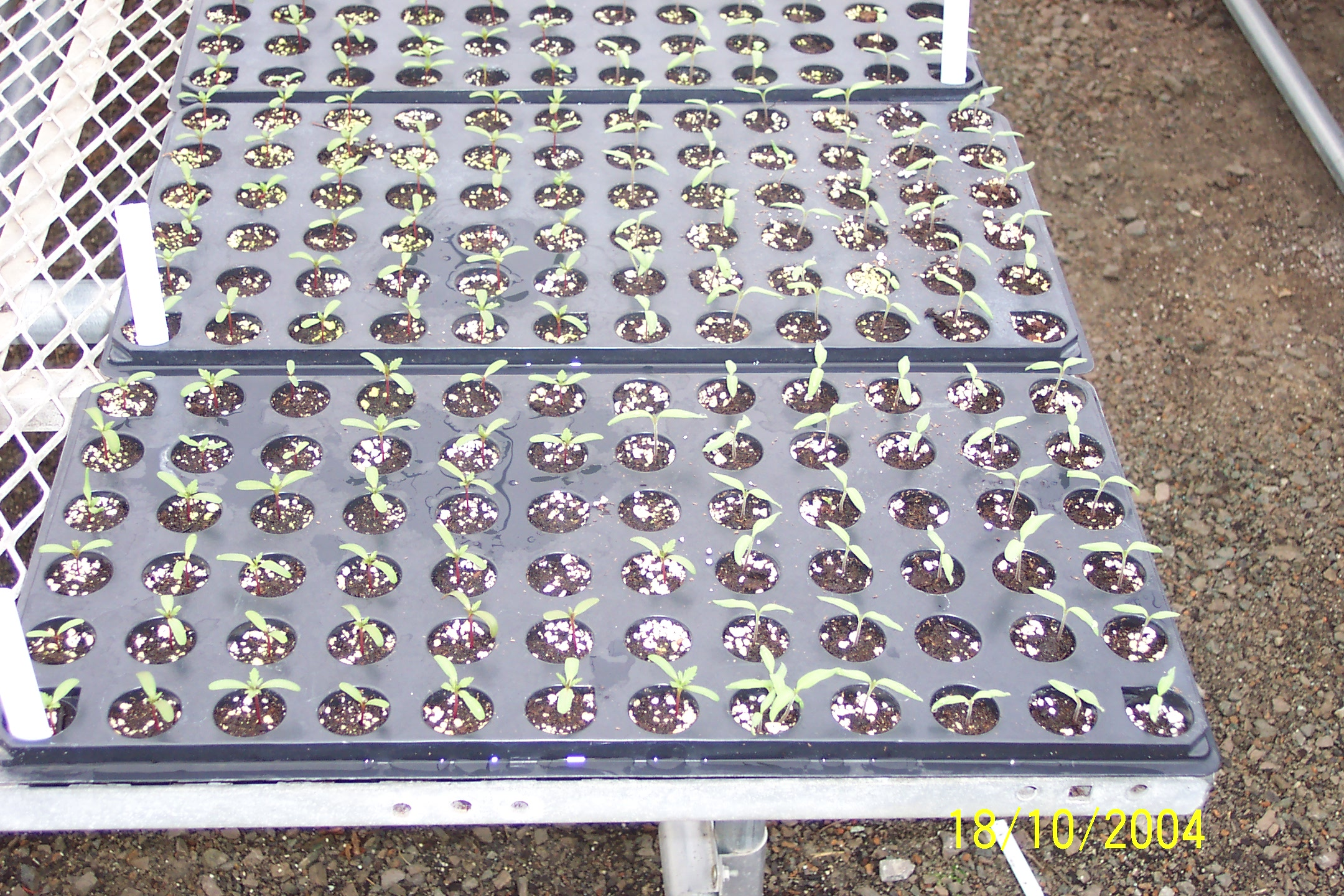
Seedlings in a plug tray.

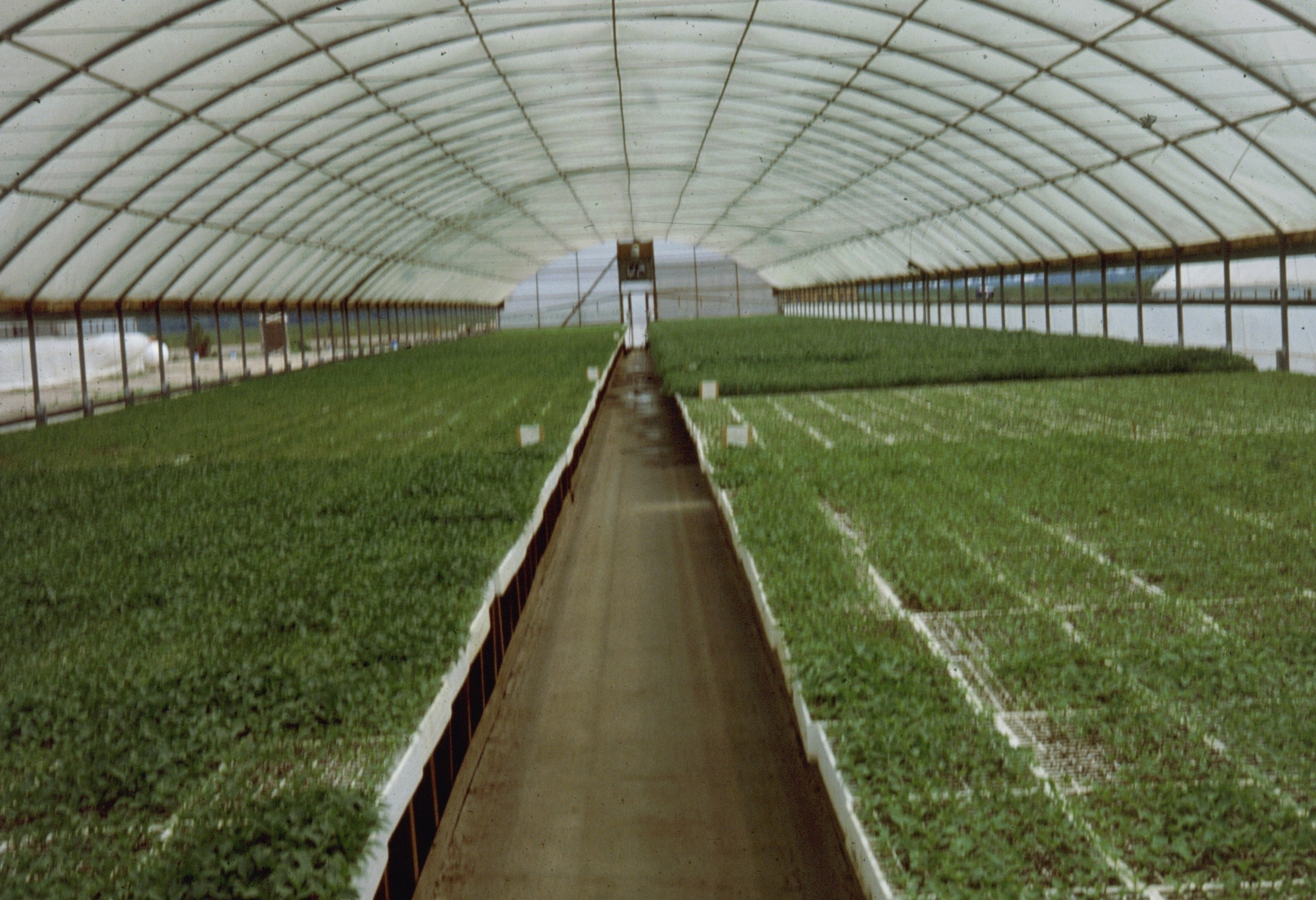
Greenhouse adapted to seedling production.

The production of flower seedlings and cuttings, young plants, has become its own group in the floral industry. Companies have become specialized to grow flower plants from seed, cuttings, bulbs, corms, tubers, grafting/budding, air layers and plant tissue culture. Some of these companies are large enough to have plant breeders to develop new cultivars. The young plants are shipped to other plant production greenhouses to finish and distribute the plants to service businesses or to retailers. Specialized young plant growers can increase the yield and turnover of young plants with specialized facilities. Producers of cuttings and tissue culture explants can ship their product anywhere in the world because potting soil quarantines are not involved. These companies are often located in tropical climates around the world to meet the world market demands.

== Floral industry markets ==
The plants of the floral industry brighten and enhance the human environment. Many people are employed to bring these plants to humans that enjoy and need them.

The retail segment is composed of people who make all or a portion of their salary selling flowers and plants. Local independent garden centres and florists lead the list, with local nurseries, interior landscape (plantscaping) and retail greenhouses close behind. Generally, these businesses sell only plants along with related professional design and installation services. Extensive plant knowledge is often an important consideration to consumers. Local hardware stores (home improvement centers), supermarkets and department stores sell flowers and plants to consumers as well. Flowers and plants are also sold at local farmers' markets, roadside stands, sidewalk shops, etc. Cut flowers, seeds, supplies and plants are also sold by mail order companies direct to consumers.

The wholesale segment supports the retail segment by delivering flowers and plants on a timely basis. Garden centres are supplied by large regional greenhouses and nurseries where the plants are grown to the garden centres specifications. Hardware stores are supplied by much larger greenhouses and nurseries that grow the plants and supply many hardware stores in a multi-state area. The plants are shipped in trucks on carts after they have been "packaged" at the greenhouse. Most of the plants are distributed based on contracts negotiated months before sales occur. The largest greenhouses and nurseries often hire merchandizing companies to manage the plants at the hardware stores. Florists receive cut flowers and cut cultivated greens from regional wholesale florists. The wholesale florists receive large shipments of boxes of cut flowers, condition the flowers and redistribute them to florists on a truck route. The flowers can come from anywhere in the world and are picked up at an airport or delivered by truck. Supermarkets receive flowers and plants from the company's distribution center. Cut flowers come to the distribution centers from anywhere in the world and potted plants will come from regional greenhouses and nurseries.

Allied trade companies are also important to the floral industry:

- Plant breeders produce hundreds of improved cultivars needed in the industry as older cultivars are replaced. The majority of the industry's plants are propagated vegetatively, these plants mutate over time and must be replaced with improved cultivars.
  - Current and new cultivars are propagated by companies that sell seed, bulbs, cuttings, plugs (young plants), tissue culture explants, etc. to the large wholesale greenhouses and nurseries, locally and throughout the world, to produce the flower crops.
  - Young plants of roses, carnations, chrysanthemums, etc. are distributed to the large growers in the Netherlands, Colombia, Kenya, China, India, etc. that will grow the cut flower crops. For example, rose plants, will produce flowers for sale up to 5 years or more at a cut flower greenhouse.
  - Similarly, young plants will be distributed for bedding plant, potted flowering plant and foliage plant production. Seed of impatiens plants will be sown at a young plant grower, shipped 4–6 weeks later to a production greenhouse, transplanted by a robotic transplanting machine, grown for 4 weeks, loaded onto a truck and sold to a consumer a few days later.
- The companies that design, manufacture, and construct greenhouses are a key part of the floral industry. These companies bring the pieces of controlled-environment agriculture (CEA) to the flower business by integrating heating, cooling, supplemental lighting, irrigation, water quality, fertilizers, materials handling, etc. The companies that design and install robotic equipment and transplanting machines for the greenhouse and for grading and packaging cut flowers participate here.
- The manufacture and sale of containers are an integral part of the floral industry.
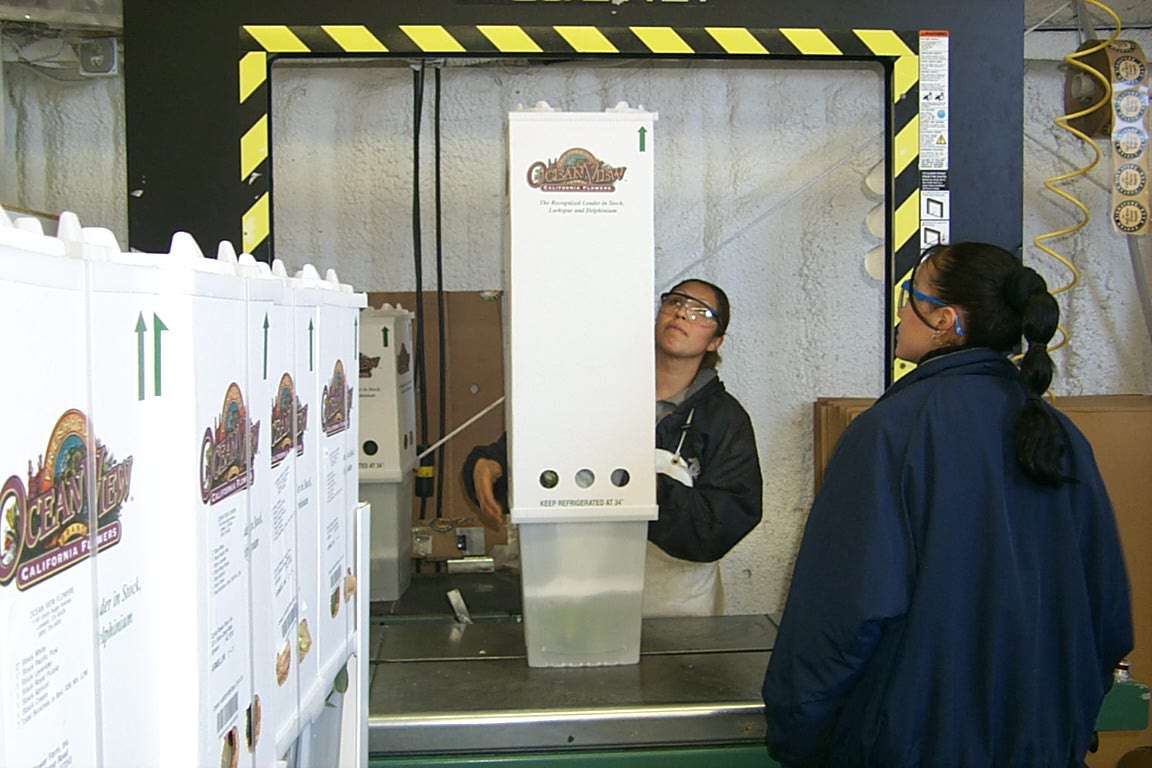
  Procona system for shipping cut flowers in water on pallet
  - Start with the cardboard boxes for shipping cut flowers and cut greens and the large containers for air transport.
  - Some flowers are packed in pallets covered with a special grade of stretch film called Air-O film that allows air circulation in the pallets.
  - Certain flowers, orchids, gerberas, water lilies, etc., cannot survive for long periods out of water so these flowers are sent with their own sealed water container (called picks) on each stem end - for more expensive or tropical flowers - or are transported in buckets of water (Dutch flower bucket and Procona). The latter method extends the life of flowers and reduces labour time as flowers are ready for sale, but also reduces the amount of flowers that can be transported as they are much heavier than dry-packed flowers and hence air transportation charges are higher.
  - Containers for floral arrangements of all kinds.
  - Clay and plastic pots and saucers of all sizes.
  - Bedding plant trays, flats, inserts of all sizes and configurations.
  - Compostable materials used for pots and trays.
- Companies that harvest materials, peat, bark, coir, perlite, etc., for potting soil (growing media), process and package these materials.
- Pest management companies have diversified over the last 20 years. Pesticides to control insects, mites, diseases (pathogens), mollusks (snails, slugs), etc. have had a primary role in the floral industry. Flowers have been sold as a "flawless thing of beauty" so pests and damage from pests had to be eliminated for flower sales to occur. Initially, many of the worst chemicals were used because flowers were not consumed so there was no health threat. Pesticide chemicals have become safer since the 1970s and, unfortunately, are still used. Integrated pest management practices began in the 1980s and have continued to develop. The use of predatory insects to control the primary pest (whiteflies, thrips, mites, aphids, mealybugs) problems has continued to increase. Long term crops, such as roses, have changed from the most pesticides applied to few pesticides applied because of the use of biological pest control of the insect and mite pests. It is still difficult to use biological pest control on short term crops, such as many bedding plants, but growers continue to reduce pesticide usage.

== Companies ==
- Bill Doran Company (US)
- Florists' Transworld Delivery (FTD) (US)
- Teleflora (US)
- 1800 Flowers (US)
- Lachaume (France)
- more florist companies by category

== Trade organizations ==
- Royal FloraHolland
- Asocolflores Colombia
- Society of American Florists US
- Commercial Horticultural Association (CHA) UK
- Produce Marketing Association US
- British Florist Association
- Ethiopian Horticulture Producer Exporters Association (EHPEA)
- National Greenhouse Manufacturers Association US
- AmericanHort US
- Kenya Flower Council
- Indonesian Flower Association (ASBINDO)

== See also ==
- Slow Flowers
