= Kenya Flower Council =

The Kenya Flower Council is a voluntary body of industrial association for floriculture in Kenya. Its secretariat is in Nairobi.

== Trade association for flower industry ==
The Council is involved in issues of industry lobbying, worker safety, environmental protection, industrial regulation, industrial development and flower farming company accreditation, as well as more weighty issues of global carbon dioxide emissions and international industrial diplomacy. KFC Code of Practice (CoP) is assigned to the whole flower industry in Kenya, promoting good agricultural practice, sustainability and social accountability, while hygiene health and safety is highly respected along with capacity building, environmental protection and conservation to adhere to.

In 1970, Kenya did not export floriculture crops, and it is currently the major exporter to the European Union, as an exporter of 38% of cut flower into the EU. The main European Union markets are Holland, United Kingdom, Germany, France, and Switzerland. Kenya’s export of cut flowers for international flower market started to expand in 1990, both in volume and value year by year. It was 10,946 tons in 1988, 86,480 tons (2006) and reached 122,825 tons in 2015. According to Kenya National Bureau of Statistics in 2014, the flower farming industry earned Kshs 54.6 billion.

The Kenya Flower Council was formed in 1996 to represent those independent Kenyan cut flower and ornamental plant growers with exporters, and its membership counts approximately 100 enlisted as of August 2016 with 3,000 small scale out growers.

That membership provides over 65% of the flowers exported. The increasing demand in the UK market especially on mixed bouquets encouraged more direct sales from Kenya, in contrast to the conventional auction system. However, as Kenyan flower industry has grown to dominate the UK market, social and environmental strains was caused rooted in the rose farms surrounding Lake Naivasha which was brought to the attention of EU media. (Note: Labors coming into the area from other regions was benefited with the booming flower industry, however led tension among local society which was predominantly supported by grazing. Being dependent on the lake waters and requires farming lands, floriculture industry caused dilemma for economic growth against ecosystem preservation, as water access for herd began to compete with farming water intake, or grazing land was decreased by developing farm lands. In short, the tension and conflict of interest were indicated for Masaii herders against Kikuyu flower farmers.)

== Lobbying in the EU ==
In 2015, Kenya Flower Council announced to the flower industry to put up programs and implement compliance regulation nationwide in response to the importing nations and their move for stringent regulations; the import taxes EU imposed on Kenyan cut flowers in October 2014 was seen slowing down the industry. However, the planning and advice the Council provided for the reform failed to meet the timetable set by the EU to result in penalty money on the industry. (Note: Europe imposed tariffs on Kenya’s cut flowers in October 2015, and local flower companies in Kenya reacted with plans to meet the requirements by political and commercial plans. Kenya's failure to sign a new trade agreement cost €3m (£2.3m).)

With a financial aid of 400,000 US dollars provided by the Dutch government for the program implementation, the KFC anticipated to involve all sectors in the Kenyan flower industry by the end of 2015.

Kenya provides 40 percent of all European Union imports with its floricultural produces, and the risk to lose competition against other developing cut flower exporters in the world put the industry in Kenya to meet the EU regulation in the form of tariff, which was lifted in December 2015.

== Industrial development schemes ==
Rwanda is negotiated for ODA partnership with Kenyan government to gain support on cut flower industry. A development of flower park is initiated by KFC, expanding over 35 hectare is discussed located in 30 kilometers' radius from Kigali, Rwanda's capital. By 2017, estimated income to Rwandan government from the local flower farming industry will be in excess of $200 million, or annual yield of three million cut flowers

== Auditing and accreditation activities ==
Domestically, the Kenya Flower Council (KFC) is affiliated with the Horticultural Crops Development Authority (HCDA), the Fresh Produce Exporters Association of Kenya (FPEAK) and with the Kenya Bureau of Standards (KEBS). It publishes a detailed Code of Practice (CoP) and employs a rating system for its member companies, involving Gold Standard ranking, Silver Standard ranking and Associate rankings. Globally, the board subscribes to the Good Agricultural Practices guideline system of the Food and Agriculture Organization of the United Nations (FAO), and to GLOBALG.A.P. A yearly growth of 5 percent is anticipated for the flower industry in Kenya between 2016 and 2020, and the government is going to continue investments as well as to accumulate and expand growth rate each year. According to KEBS in 2014, the floriculture industry earned Kshs (Kenya Shillings) 54.6 billion.

HCDA reported provisional statistics in 2015 that Kshs 62.9 billion was earned by the Kenyan cut flower industry.
