= Society of American Florists =

US trade association

- Predecessor: American Association of Nurserymen, Florists and Seedsmen
- Formation: January 1884; 142 years ago
- Type: NGO
- Legal status: Trade Association
- Purpose: SAF provides marketing, government advocacy, industry intelligence and best practices information for participants in the U.S. floral industry.
- Location: Alexandria, VA
- President and Chairperson: Oscar Fernandez
- President-Elect: Lori Wheat
- Executive Vice President & CEO: Kate F. Penn
- Key people: Amanda Jedlinsky, Laura Weaver, Joe Aldeguer
- Main organ: Floral Management Magazine
- Staff: 13 (2025)
- Volunteers: 50+ (2019)
- Website: safnow.org

The Society of American Florists (SAF) is a national US trade association representing floristry in the United States (US). It was formed in Chicago, IL by 21 members of the American Association of Nurserymen, Florists and Seedsmen and chartered by an act of Congress in 1884 as the Society of American Florists. The Society of American Florists provides marketing, government advocacy, industry intelligence, and best practices information for all segments (growers, wholesalers, importers, manufacturers, suppliers, educators, students and allied organizations) of the US floral industry.

== Boards and councils ==
The volunteer leaders of SAF serve on a number of councils and committees. The SAF Board of Directors is responsible for making crucial decisions that guide SAF programs. It includes an executive committee and a board of directors.

The Growers Council represents the needs of the grower industry segment within the Society of American Florists. The Retailers Council represents the needs of the retailer industry segment within the Society of American Florists. The Wholesalers Council represents the needs of the wholesale industry segment within the Society of American Florists.

Awards Committee, Consumer Joint Council, Convention Task Force, Government Joint Council, Member Joint Council, and PFCI Board of Trustees

== Events and education ==
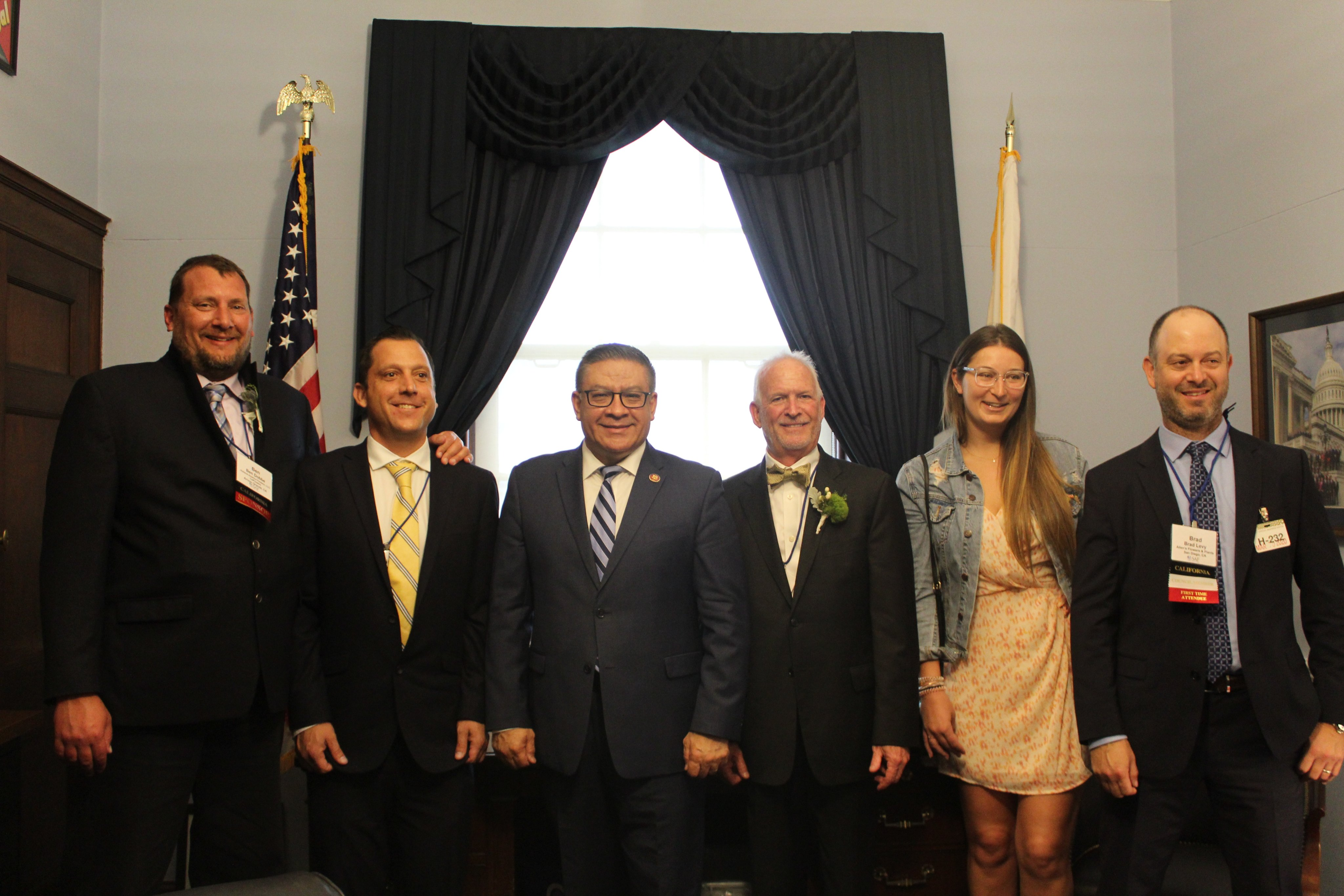
Society of American Florists with Salud Carbajal in 2020.

SAF offers florists a number of professional development programs and related events that provide education and networking opportunities. SAF holds an annual convention that lasts several days and includes educational programs covering various aspects of the floral industry. Each year in March the SAF [political action committee] arranges for members come to Washington, U.S. to learn more about the state of the industry and lobby on behalf of relevant issues.

The Profit-Blast format includes three educational sessions held daily in different cities across the United States. It was introduced to provide access for participants unable to attend the annual convention. The Next Gen program brings together floral professionals aged 45 and under The program is intended for early-career participants in the industry.

== Certifications ==
SAF offers two different certifications for achievement in and contribution to the floral industry.

=== American Academy of Floriculture (AAF) ===
AAF certification recognizes industry members for their service to the floral industry and their communities. Established in 1965, nomination and acceptance into the Academy are open to qualified persons in all segments of the industry. AAF members include retailers, wholesalers, growers, educators, scientists, designers, and more.

=== Professional Floral Communicators – International (PFCI) ===
PFCI is awarded to floral educators who, after a rigorous screening process and peer review, have proven they are able to speak authoritatively about industry topics such as the principles and elements of floral design, the care and handling of flowers and plants, and effective business management techniques.

== Membership ==
SAF has four main types of members: retail florists, growers, wholesalers/importers, and suppliers. There are also additional categories for students, educators, state floral associations, and independent designers. Fees depend on segment and annual revenue.
