= Slow Flowers =

Campaign for local flower industry

- Formation: 2014; 12 years ago
- Members: 600
- Founder: Debra Prinzing
- Website: slowflowers.com

Slow Flowers is a movement promoting the support and purchase of American-grown flowers in the United States. Similar to the Slow Food movement—aimed at preserving local, sustainable food and traditional cooking—Slow Flowers encourages consumers to support their local economy and consciously purchase cut flowers grown locally, seasonally and ethically in the United States, instead of purchasing flowers imported from other countries or flowers grown using chemicals and pesticides. The philosophy behind slow flowers is part of the wider slow movement. The Slow Flowers Community was founded by author and writer Debra Prinzing in 2014 after she authored a book titled Slow Flowers, in which the term "slow flowers movement" was coined, and the movement has since spread internationally.

== The Slow Flowers Movement ==
The inspiration behind the philosophy of Slow Flowers can be traced back to author Amy Stewart’s book Flower Confidential: The Good, the Bad and the Beautiful (2007), which provides an in-depth look into the floral industry. Among its revelations, the book sheds light on the genetic engineering and breeding of flowers, the exploitation of workers, pollution and the importation of cheap flowers in the flower industry.

In the U.S., consumers spend on average between $7 billion and $8 billion on cut flowers annually. Of those flowers, imported cut flowers account for 80 percent, with an estimated 5.6 billion stems sold annually imported from countries including Colombia, Costa Rica, Ecuador, Mexico, Netherlands, Dominican Republic, Malaysia, Thailand, Peru, Guatemala, Chile, India, Italy, Kenya, South Africa, Israel, Spain, Japan, Canada, Ethiopia, Australia, Nicaragua, New Zealand, Taiwan, Vietnam, Argentina, Brazil, Zimbabwe and France. In the U.S., cut flowers largely come from the west coast in California where blooms like daffodils, orchids and mums are grown. American-grown flowers used to account for 64 percent of the flowers sold domestically, according to data from 1991. However since then, and shortly after the introduction of the Andean Trade Promotion and Drug Eradication Act, the number of domestically-grown flowers sold in the U.S. has been on the decline, with 50 percent of North American flower farms no longer in business due to the competing, cheaper prices of flowers grown in South America.

In terms of cost, flowers grown in the U.S. often cost more to produce which means they can be more expensive compared to imported flowers. Imported products are also not generally required to meet the same environmental and labor standards as crops and products grown domestically, which also influences pricing. Additionally, country of origin labeling laws are not enforced, so the origin as well as ethical and environmental footprint of flowers are largely unknown. However, it has been stated that stiffer regulations are now in place in Colombia and Ecuador’s industries with bans on certain chemicals and minimum wage requirements. In both the U.S. and South America, there are certification programs like Veriflora, Florverde, Bloom Check, Certified Naturally Grown and Salmon Safe that growers can participate in that focus on improving environmental standards, meaning blooms grown with these certifications are grown under stricter guidelines with less chemicals and harmful pesticides, and some of these programs also focus on worker standards.

The Slow Flowers movement has been part of the effort to establish a philosophy of employing sustainable practices, supporting the local economy and reducing chemical use through the purchase of domestically and ethically grown flowers that is being adopted by florists, flower farmers and consumers. To garner additional support for the movement and flowers grown and sold domestically in the U.S., and to help address the lack of knowledge around origins of flowers and the no-labeling requirement for flowers in the U.S., the Certified American Grown label has since been placed on the sleeves of blooms sold in grocery stores including Trader Joe's, Whole Foods and Safeway. Labels such as “fair trade”, “organic” and “sustainable” are also placed on bouquets sold in grocery stores and through online retailers.

In the last decade, the number of flower farms selling cut flowers domestically increased almost 20 percent between 2007 and 2012 from 5,085 to 5,903, according to the USDA. Farm shares or community supported agriculture (CSAs) are also featuring fresh flowers as part of their annual subscription services, offering large to small bouquets that are collected weekly or bi-weekly alongside farm-grown fruits and vegetables. Additionally, the U.S. has seen the development of the Congressional Cut Flower Caucus, which has helped leverage additional support in raising awareness about supporting American flower farmers and floral products.

== Slow Flowers Community ==
At its core, Slow Flowers was established to promote the conscious purchase of buying and selling locally and sustainably grown flowers in the United States. As of November, 2023, the Slow Flowers Community has nearly 700 members with 660 members in the United States and 33 members in Canada. Members of the Slow Flowers community are predominantly small-scale growers, producers and designers who are working to transform the flower industry by leveraging the field-to-vase or locally grown flower philosophy.
