= Lachaume =

- Company type: Private
- Industry: Florist
- Founded: 1845; 180 years ago
- Founder: Jules Lachaume
- Headquarters: Paris, France
- Website: maisonlachaume.com

Lachaume is a French high-end florist based in Paris. It is one of the oldest florists in Paris.

== History ==
Lachaume was founded in 1845 by Jules Lachaume. The original shop was located on the Chaussée d'Antin, in a then-fashionable district of Paris. In 1847, Jules Lachaume wrote a book on flowers covering a wide variety of topics relating to floristry. In 1889, the shop relocated to the upscale Rue Royale (in the 8th arrondissement of Paris), positioning itself among leading fashion and jewelry houses. Marcel Proust frequented Lachaume to buy a cattleya orchid he wore daily. In 1947, Christian Dior showcased his inaugural couture collection in his Avenue Montaigne salons adorned with Lachaume's floral arrangements. Subsequently, designers Yves Saint Laurent and Karl Lagerfeld also became regular buyers.

In 1970, Giuseppina Callegari took over the business and later transferred ownership to her son, Didier Vassy and his wife Colette Vassy, and later to her granddaughters, Caroline Cnocquaert and Stéphanie Primet.

In 2013, Lachaume moved to Rue du Faubourg Saint-Honoré in the 8th arrondissement of Paris, near the Élysée Palace, maintaining its traditional decor.

== Store ==
Located on Rue du Faubourg Saint-Honoré, Lachaume continues to sell a variety of flowers and bouquets, dried flowers, dried wheat bouquets, and eternal flowers.
