= Villa Guerrero, State of Mexico =

Villa Guerrero
- Municipality
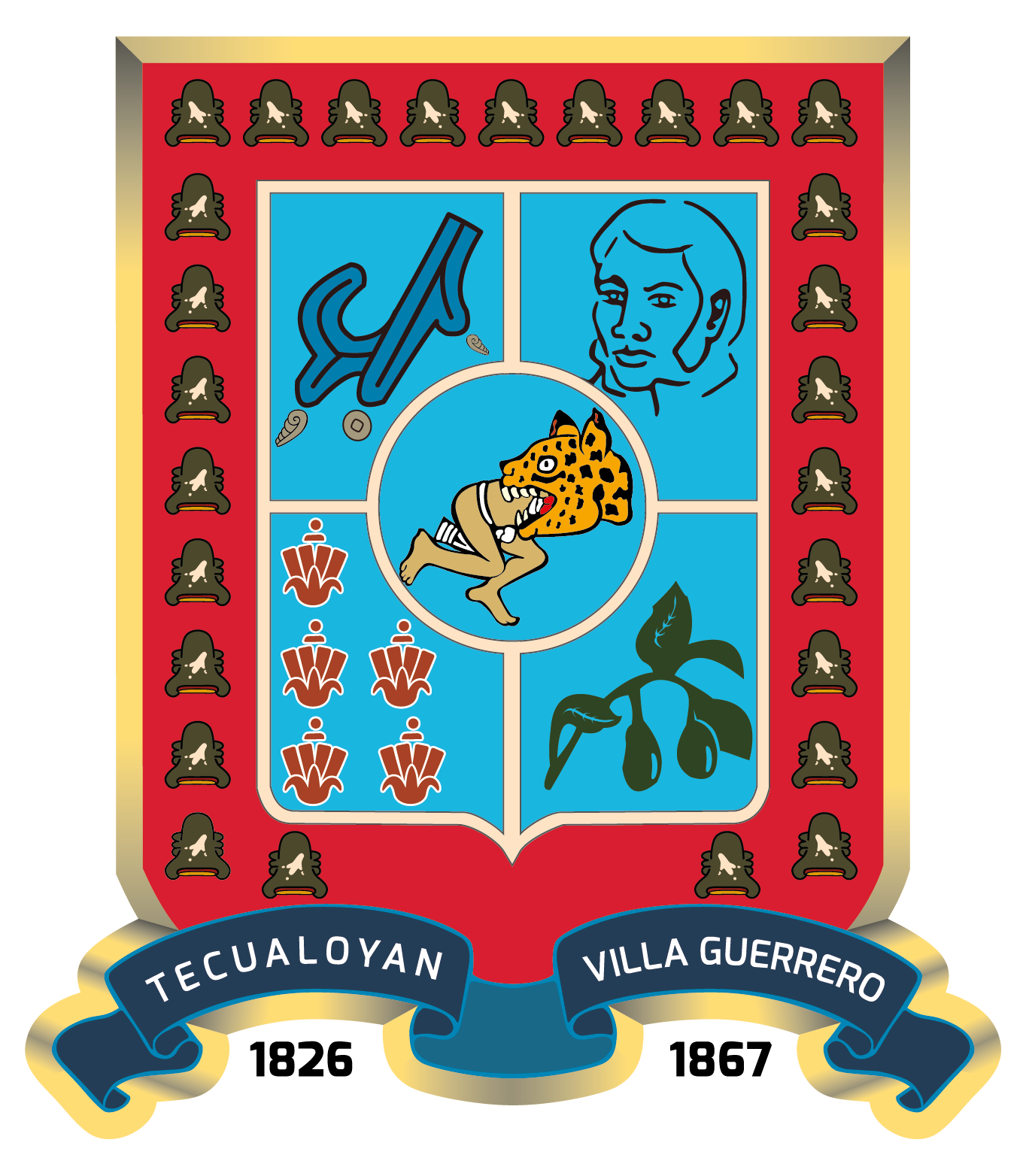
- Coat of arms
- Interactive map of Villa Guerrero
- Coordinates: 18°57′36″N 99°38′24″W
- Country: Mexico
- State: State of Mexico
- Municipal Seat: Villa Guerrero

Government
  - Municipal president: C. Tito Maya de la Cruz m(2016)
- Time zone: UTC-6 (CST)
- Website: http://www.villa-guerrero.com (non-official)

Villa Guerrero is a municipality in the State of Mexico, Mexico. The municipal seat is the town of Villa Guerrero. It is located on the southern slopes of the Nevado de Toluca, also known as Xinantecatl, and is 50 minutes/58 km from Toluca.

== The town ==
Its original name of the town was Tequaloyan, which literally in Náhuatl means "place where there are wild beasts that devour men". The Prehispanic philosophy said that Tequani u Ocelotl (jaguar) was the symbol of the west, where the sun goes underground, to make a nocturnal trip and visit the Mictlan or Dead World, sharing its trip with the Wolf Dog as a guide (or Venus as Tlahuiscalpanteuhctli, lord of the rising, to be born in the morning as a new flowered boon. Probably the original name either comes from the previous existence of wild animals called tecuani (tē = "someone, people"; cuā = "eat"; ni = "habitual" suffix), as now noted in the coat of arms shield. Its name was changed in 1867 to honor the duty and courage of its inhabitants, who participated in many war successes during the nineteenth century, such as the Independence battle of January 19 and 20, 1812, National Guard in 1547 and help in Monterrey under command of Santiago Tapia during American intervention, successful battle on September 14, 1857, versus General Jose Maria Cobos, anti liberal army, National guard at Puebla to fight the French Army on May 5, 1862.

Tequaloyan started out as an Ulmec settlement coming from the Gulf of Mexico, which is why the cult to the ocelot named Nahuatl Ocelotl Tequani giving significance to the name of the town and people (Tequanipas) surely was re-founded by the Otomis in the seventh century. Starting in the tenth century, it came under the influence of the Toltec and Teotihuacan civilizations. From 1221 to 1295, it was part of the Cuitlach Teuhctli domain. In 1472 the area was conquered by the Aztec Empire under Axayacatl. During this period, the town of Tequaloyan, along with some other communities, rose in importance.

After the Spanish conquest, the town became an administrative and political center, with the surrounding lands distributed to various conquistadors who created a number of haciendas including San Miguel, San José, and San Nicolás Buenavista. The natives were evangelized by Augustinians who came from neighboring Malinalco. One of the first secular governors was Don Miguel Sanchez, who signed a title of land for neighbour Iztlahuatzinco, with the presence of Pedro de Gante and Alonso de Santiago in 1560. True separation of ecclesiastical and secular powers came about between 1692 and 1744, finalizing with the naming of Juan de la Cruz as Governor of Tequaloyan, with ecclesiastical authority in the area remaining with Malinalco and Tenancingo.

During the Mexican War of Independence, one battle between the insurgents and royalist forces took place here on January 3, 1812. Rosendo Porlier of the royalist forces attacked José María Oviedo of the rebels, who fortified the town and helped to defend it. Porlier returned on January 17 to attack Tequaloyan as the nearby ravine of the Texcaltenco River, leading to Oviedo's death. This hastened the arrival of José María Morelos, who along with Hermenegildo Galeana, Nicolás Bravo and Mariano Matamoros gathered a force of 3,200 men to defeat the royalist forces on the 19th and 20th of the same month, allowing the insurgents to win again at Tenancingo two days later.

Because of its size at the time (over 1,000 inhabitants), Tequaloyan was designated officially as a municipality with the promulgation of the Constitución Española de Cádiz in 1812, with Don Francisco Hernández as the first mayor; however, it belonged first to the municipality of Malinalco until 1826 when the town voted to secede. This is considered to be the foundation of the town's free municipal seat status.

During American Intervention, the inhabitants were rehabilitated as National Guard and fought with the Mexican Army at Padierna and Molino del Reyn neighbourhood of Chapultepec in Mexico City.

At the promulgation of Liberal Constitution in 1857, the inhabitants of Tequaloyan fought many times versus the Conservator Army commanded for Jose Maria Cobos and had a successful battle on September the 14th, some time after, combat the French Army in Puebla on May 5, 1862, so at the end of Juarez Reform, its main town grew up to "Villa Guerrero", to honor duty and courage of the inhabitants. on April 20, 1867, not before at one tax trade to rebuild the official buildings.

During the Mexican Revolution, on August 18, 1914, Constitutionalist forces under Lt. Col. Bruno Neira entered the town to confront those sympathetic to the Zapatista cause.

According with the results presented by INEGI in 2005, the town has a total of 18,437 inhabitants.

As municipal seat, the town of Villa Guerrero is the governing authority for the following communities: Buenavista El Carmen, Cruz Vidriada, La Finca, El Islote, El Izote, Jesús Carranza (Rancho de Jesús), La Loma de la Concepción (La Loma), Matlazinca, El Moral, Porfirio Díaz, Potrero de la Sierra, Potrero Nuevo, El Progreso Hidalgo, San Bartolomé (San Bartolo), San Diego, San Felipe, San Francisco, San Gaspar, San José, San Lucas, San Mateo Coapexco, San Miguel, San Pedro Buenos Aires (San Pedro), Santa María Aranzazú (Santa María), Santiago Oxtotitlán, Tequimilpa, Totolmajac, Zacango, Coxcacoaco, Ejido de la Finca, La Joya, El Peñón, Ejido de San Mateo Coapexco, Los Ranchos de San José, La Merced (Ex-hacienda la Merced), El Potrero, Loma del Capulín, Los Arroyos (La Baja de San Felipe), Cuajimalpa (Los Cuervos), Presa Tecualoya, Loma de Zacango (El Aventurero), San Martín, El Venturero Santa María Aranzazú, La Alta de Santiago Oxtotitlán, La Loma de Santiago Oxtotitlán, El Potrero de Santiago Oxtotitlán, Potrerillos Santa María Villa Guerrero, and Zanjillas San Bartolomé.

== The municipality ==
The municipality is 267.8 square kilometers, and has a total population of 52,090.

Villa Guerrero is bordered to the north by Zinacantepec, Toluca, Calimaya and Tenango del Valle; to the east by the municipalities of Tenancingo and Zumpahuacán, to the south by Ixtapan de la Sal and to the west with the same Ixtapan de la Sal and Coatepec Harinas.

Its two major geographical features (aside from the view of the Nevado de Toluca) are the Cerro (Hill) Cuate or of Cuaximalpa with an altitude of 3,760 meters above sea level, followed by the Cerro Cuexcontepec at 3,330 meters. A chain of hills coming down from the Chignahuitecatl volcano divides the municipality on the east from Ixtapan de la Sal and Coatepec Harinas. It is noted for its deep ravines and jagged cliffs and has been compared to Riasa, in Spain. As part of the Alto Balsas basin, it has a number of rivers including the Texcaltenco, the Chiquito de Santa María, the San Gaspar, the Los Tizantez, the Tequimilpa, the Cruz Colorada or San Mateo and the Calderón. Many of these contain waterfalls such as the Salto de Candelitas, the Atlaquisca, the Maquilero; the Salto del Río Grande de San Gaspar, and the Salto de la Neblina, called like this, because never ends of falling but change its water for a perpetual foggy. The territory also possesses natural springs such as La Estrella, La Piedra Ahuecada, El Coponial, Los Chicamoles, and El Agua de la Pila as well as a thermal spring popularly known as El Salitre.

== Floriculture and logistical advantages ==
The most important economic developments in Villa guerrero occurred from the 1930s to the 1950s when large numbers of Japanese immigrants settled in the area, initiating floriculture. Roses in various varieties, are the primary flower grown, followed by the "gerbera", the lilies as "casablanca", the "stargeiser", chrysanthemum and the Dutch tulip as well as other ornamental plants such as the dollar eucalyptus, aster and most recently many filler plants. The quality of Villa Guerrero's flowers has allowed them to penetrate national and international flower markets, exporting flowers to the United States, Canada and various European countries. This floriculture is said to be the "pride of the Villaguerrenses" and is now the main economic staple of the municipality. In the 2005–2010 period the Mexican Flower Council, the most important flower and pot plant growers organization, developed a special quality program that achieved WF&FSA organization membership. With more than 75% of Mexico's total flower production land, Villa Guerrero is the main producer of flowers in Mexico. Because of this, the municipality is now internationally recognized as Mexico's Flower Capital.

Floriculture is the most important factor in the economy of the Municipality of Villa Guerrero. According to reports from the municipal government, flower production generated 1,827 million pesos (approx. 91.35 million USD) only in 2010. However, the income by export hardly corresponds to 10% of the total production of flowers according to the most favorable estimates.

Villa Guerrero is a source of fresh flowers that has not been a major supplier for transnational American and Canadian wholesale flower companies. These companies buy flowers that are transported by plane into their territories from countries like Colombia, Ecuador, the Netherlands, and Kenya.

In counterpoint, the Municipality of Villa Guerrero, State of Mexico, is located at a highway distance of 1,152.00 km (716.00 mi) from Laredo, Texas. This means that the flowers of Villa Guerrero can be within the United States in just 13 hours of travel by land. Moreover, the currently underused Toluca International Airport is located at a highway distance of just 69.00 km (~ 42.87 mi) or one hour driving from Mexico's Flower Capital, making it yet a more competitive air freight option for the Canadian and American flower markets than any other flower growing country in the world. The great advantages in reducing the cost of shipping and reducing the transfer time from harvest to the display of flowers in the American and Canadian markets, have the potential to make Villa Guerrero the favorite flower supplier of both countries; as they would allow flower selling companies in both countries to increase the quality of the supply of flowers even in the furthest of their territories at an extremely competitive price. Since Mexico has already a free trade agreement with these nations (the USMCA) this could potentially be an opportunity to Mexico for stepping up as the main flower exporter to the United States, and Canada.

The Municipality of Villa Guerrero has a stable microclimate that allows it to maintain its high production of flowers throughout the year. This also represents an advantage compared to countries where drastic changes in the climate limit flower production to specific seasons of the year.

Likewise, the infrastructure that flower growers have in Villa Guerrero allows them to execute post-harvest processes in which the flowers are quickly treated for transportation in refrigerated trucks, to their storage in cooling chambers. This allows the flowers to maintain an ideal longevity once they reach the final consumer.

Although the production of flowers in the Municipality of Villa Guerrero remains constant throughout the year, it ostentatiously increases to cover the great demand of four national holidays in Mexico: Valentine's Day -in Mexico also known as Dia del Amor y la Amistad, in English, Day of Love and Friendship- Mother's Day -yearly celebrated in Mexico on May 10- Day of the Dead, and Día de la Virgen de Guadalupe (in English, Day of our Lady of Guadalupe, yearly celebrated in Mexico on Dec 12th).

The Municipality of Villa Guerrero is one of the largest producers of Mexican marigold -in Mexico known as (z)cempasúchitl (Tagetes erecta) and/or Flor de Muerto- whose greatest production is found in the vast ejidal lands of the Progreso Hidalgo rural community. Although the marigold plant is native to Mexico, nowadays many growers choose to produce hybrid varieties of marigold, as they are more attractive in the national and foreign market and they have greater vigor and longevity compared to their native counterparts. Even though the marigold plant has a great worldwide demand for its uses in the cosmetic, food, and pigment industries, in Mexico it is produced almost exclusively to satisfy the demand for the offerings that are erected during the celebration of the Day of the Dead.

For most contemporary Mexican families, the academic training of the new generations is an extremely important process. For this reason, the completion of studies in basic education, upper secondary education, and higher education, is usually a reason for large family and institutional parties. For this reason, during the first two decades of the 21st century, the flower growers of Villa Guerrero have experienced an upward trend in the demand for cut flowers during the summer graduation season -mainly in the month of July- in Mexico.

== Central de Abasto de Villa Guerrero (Supply Center of Villa Guerrero) ==
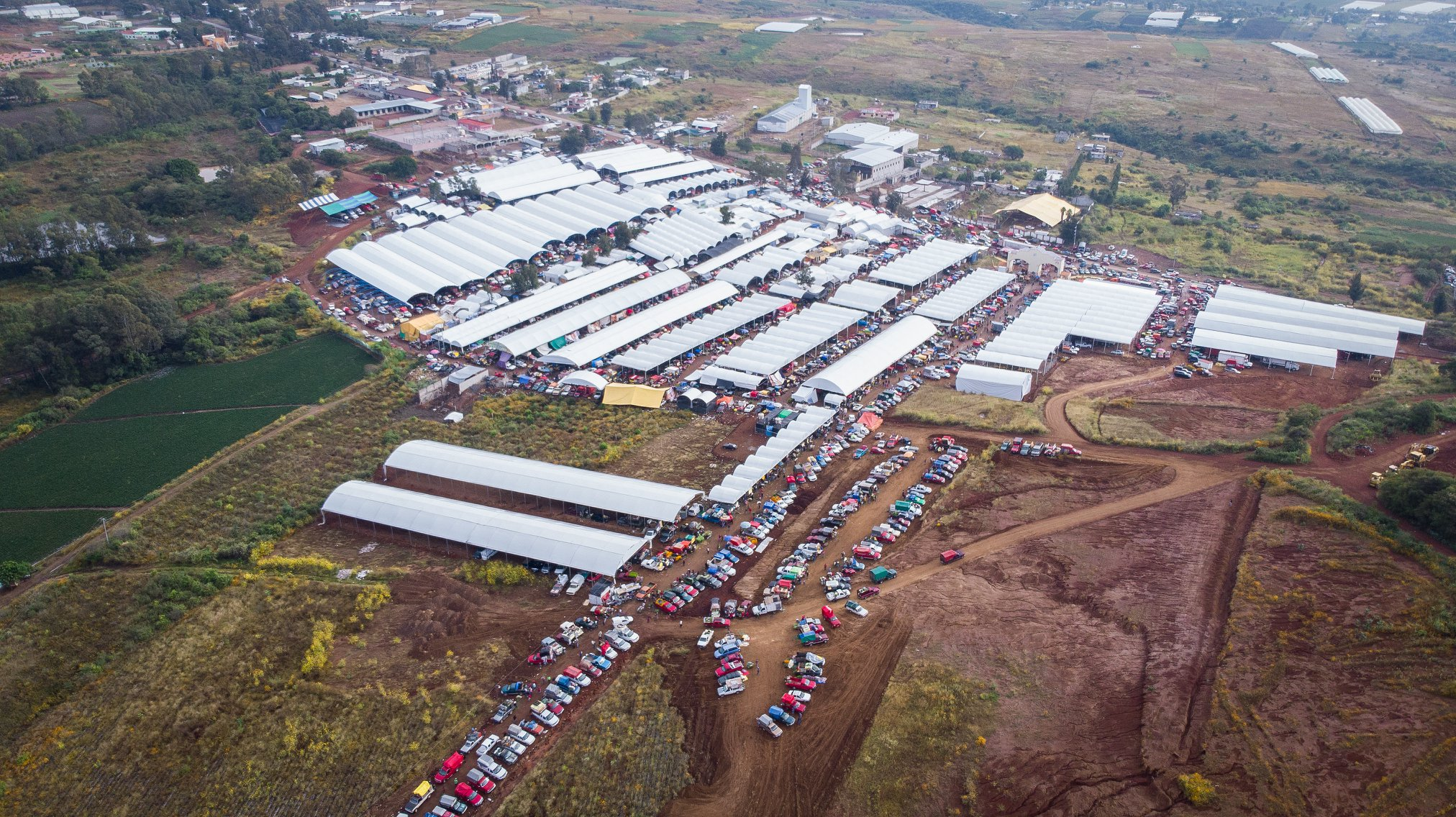
The Central de Abasto de Villa Guerrero is the main wholesale and retail market in the region known as Mexico's Flower Capital. The Central de Abasto de Villa Guerrero is a specialist in fine flowers, foliage, floral bouquets, articles related to floristry, floral packaging, and everything related to the different areas of the flower industry. However, in the Central de Abasto de Villa Guerrero there are also other products produced in the region such as: strawberries, avocados, legumes, vegetables, corn, beans, animals for fattening, and meat.

The Central de Abasto de Villa Guerrero (Supply Center of Villa Guerrero) began operations on October 21, 2017, and has a total area of 234,730.94 m² (280,735.86 yd²). Fresh cut flowers are the main product commercialized at the Supply Center of Villa Guerrero. However, the Supply Center of Villa Guerrero also offers trade opportunities for farmers, ranchers, strawberry producers (fragaria), and floral accessories merchants in the region. This space is also an attractive and convenient option for thousands of interstate merchants who, since its inauguration, have come to the Supply Center of Villa Guerrero to satisfy their huge demand for floral products. These products are taken to all the states of the Mexican republic and abroad (mostly to the United States). This mass commerce space has a direct connection to the Ixtapan de la Sal - Tenango del Valle Highway (Federal Highway 55D, second section), and to Federal Highway 55. Because of this, the wholesale merchants who usually transport their merchandise in trucks, and semi trucks, prefer to go to the extensive facilities of the Central de Abasto de Villa Guerrero located in the vicinity of the community of La Finca (Villa Guerrero), instead of visiting other supply centers located within densely populated cities; with traffic problems, and lack of space for maneuvers of commercial vehicles.

Thus, the Supply Center of Villa Guerrero has established itself as the commercial mecca of floriculture in the State of Mexico and aims to overcome Mexico City's Central de Abasto as the most important flower market of the country.

Currently, the Supply Center of Villa Guerrero has 6-meter wide roads; enough for the circulation of cars in two directions, a direct access to the Ixtapan de la Sal - Tenango del Valle Highway (Federal Highway 55D, second section), a direct access to the Federal Highway 55, two gas stations specifically designed to facilitate the maneuvers of tractors and other large vehicles, and an industrial water well to satisfy the huge water demand of the cut flower sellers.

In addition, the municipal government of Villa Guerrero is carrying out works to improve the loading area, parking, drainage, storm drainage, and paving. Finally, this project involves the construction of commercial premises, simple warehouses, refrigerated warehouses, restaurants, bank, chapel, and food area among other services.

== ASFLORVI & ExpoFlor México ==
The Asociación de Floricultores de Villa Guerrero A.C. or Flower Growers Association of Villa Guerrero, A.C., is located in the municipal seat of Villa Guerrero and has a registry of more than 700 associates. This makes it the largest flower growers association in Mexico. Known by its acronym, ASFLORVI was founded in 1991 and is made up of the main producers of flowers, foliage and floral bouquets in Villa Guerrero. Today, ASFLORVI is internationally recognized, as it is the host of the ExpoFlor México. ExpoFlor México is the most important floricultural event in the State of Mexico and was originally created by the Villa Guerrero A.C. Flower Growers Association. This event is held annually and in 2018 it had a history of 27 editions. ExpoFlor México brings together the representatives of the companies with the greatest relevance in the floriculture industry in Mexico, among which are HilverdaKooij, Plantas Técnicas Plantec, Ball SB, Sakata Seeds, Takii, Grofit Flower Seeds. This event is usually held during the fall at the facilities of the Instituto Tecnológico de Estudios Superiores de Villa Guerrero (Technological Institute of Higher Studies of Villa Guerrero), which is the largest university in the region.

At ExpoFlor México, the main commercial partners and flower producers in Mexico meet to exchange their knowledge, find new commercial partners and establish cooperative links with government entities in charge of working for the benefit of all parties.

Currently, ASFLORVI seeks to expand the presence of the Mexican fresh flowers in the international market.
