= Steve Sowden =

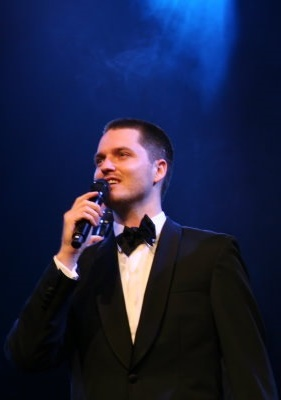
- Steve Sowden in performance in 2010

Background information
- Birth name: Steve Sowden
- Born: 14 February 1983 (age 42)
- Origin: Melbourne, Australia
- Genres: Contemporary worship music, contemporary Christian music
- Occupation(s): Worship leader, singer, pastor
- Instrument: Vocals
- Years active: 2005–present
- Labels: Planetshakers Ministries International

Steve Sowden (born, 14 February 1983), is an Australian Pentecostal worship leader and singer in the Planetshakers band.

== Biography ==
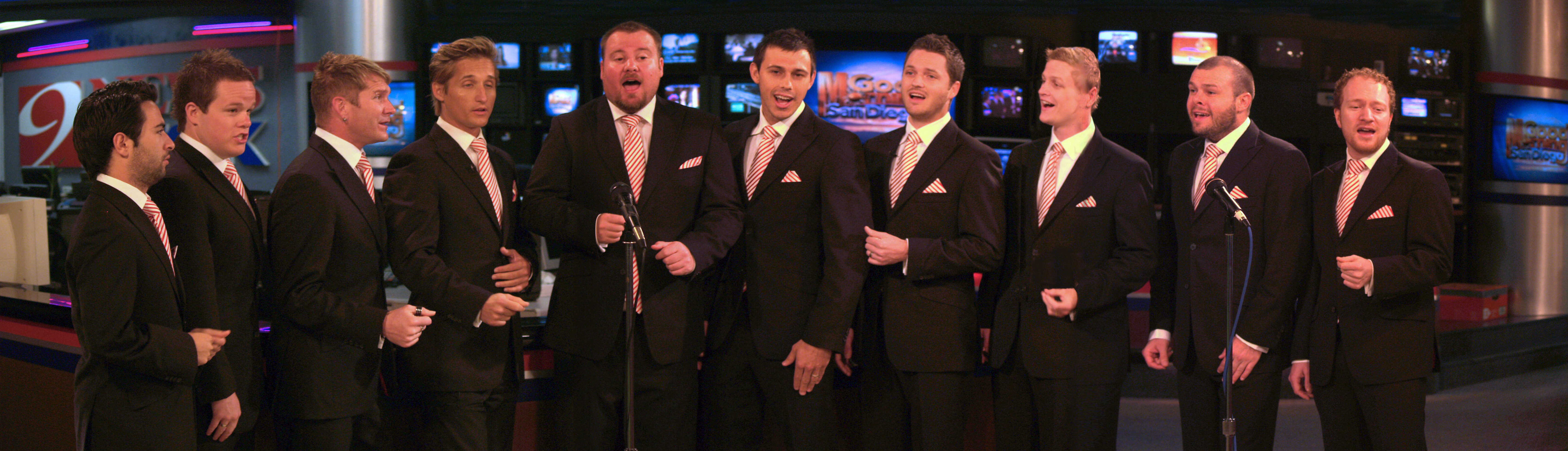
the Ten Tenors while performing at KUSI-TV in San Diego.

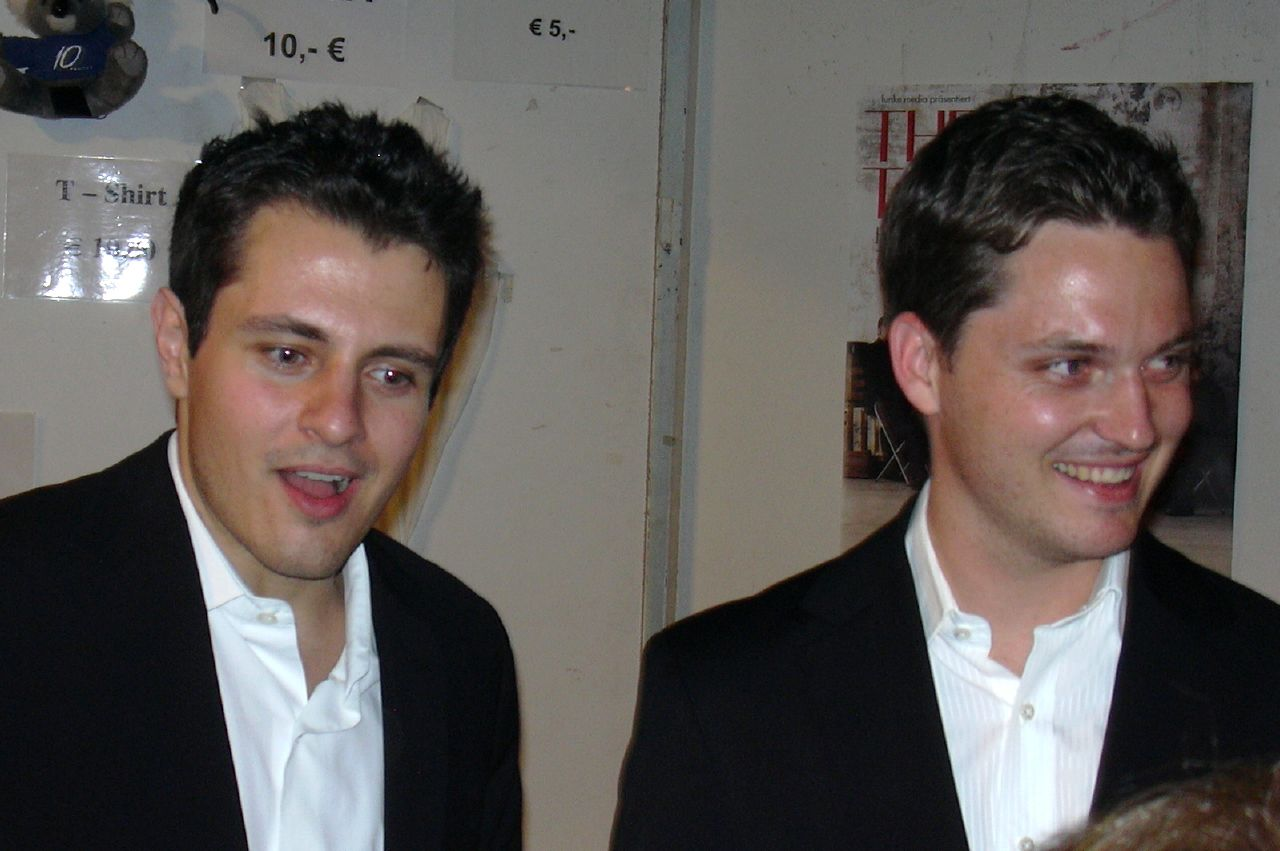
Adrian Phillips and Steve Sowden members of the Ten Tenors (2007).

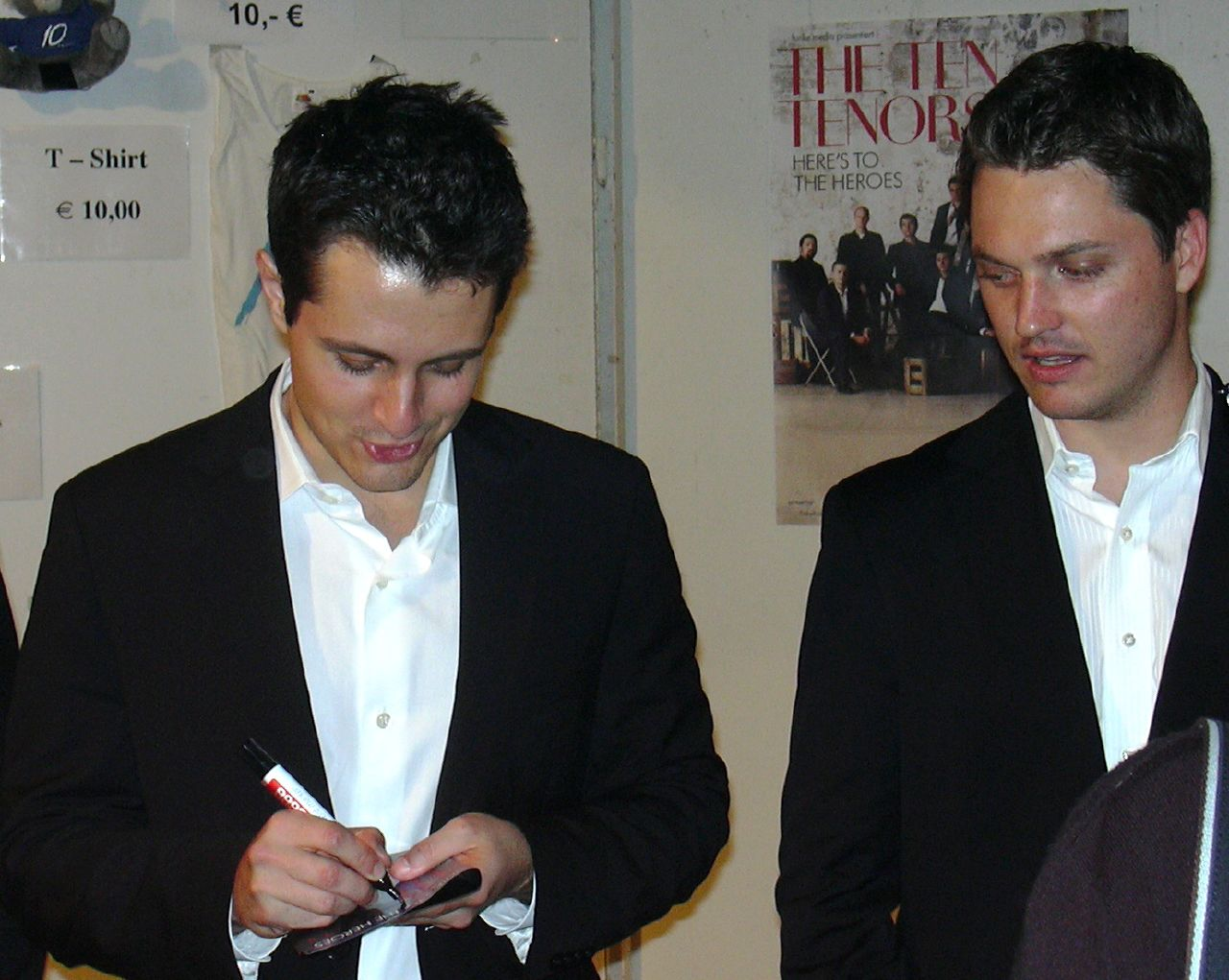
Adrian Phillips and Steve Sowden members of the Ten Tenors at the autograph signing (2007).

Steve grew up in a Christian home and later joined a church worship team as a teenager. Where he studied singing and earned a BA in Musical Theater from the Central Queensland Conservatory of Music in Australia. Throughout his singing career. Sowden was lead vocalist in Tokyo Disney-Sea Broadway Revue 'Encore' from 2005 through 2006. The following year he joined the Ten Tenors group as lead vocalist in internationally acclaimed crossover vocal group from 2006 to 2010. From 2008 until now he belongs to Planetshakers Church, where he serves as a pastor and singer.

== Personal life ==
Steve Sowden married on 4 January 2009 to Katie and together they have four children: Jonathan, Sophia, Eleanor and Joshua.

== Discography ==
=== The Ten Tenors ===
- 2006 – Here's to the Heroes No. 8 AUS
- 2008 – Nostalgica No. 27 AUS
- 2009 – Amigos Para Siempre

=== Planetshakers ===
- 2011 – Nothing Is Impossible (August 2011)
- 2012 – Heal Our Land (live, April 2012)
- 2013 – Limitless (live, January 2013)
- 2014 – Endless Praise: Live (live, March 2014) (also a deluxe edition)
- 2014 – Nada Es Imposible (in Spanish, July 2014)
- 2014 – This Is Our Time: Live (live, October 2014) (also a deluxe edition)
- 2015 – Outback Worship Sessions (May 2015)
- 2015 – #LETSGO (live, September 2015) (also a deluxe edition)
- 2016 – Momentum (Live in Manila) (March 2016)
- 2016 – Overflow: Live (live, September 2016) (also a deluxe edition)
- 2016 – Sé Quién Eres Tú (in Spanish, November 2016)
- 2017 – Legacy (live, September 2017) (also a deluxe edition)
- 2017 – Legado (in Spanish, November 2017)
- 2018 – Heaven on Earth (live, October 2018) (also a deluxe edition)
- 2019 – Rain (live, September 2019)
- 2019 – It's Christmas (November 2019)
- 2020 – Over It All (November 2020)
- 2020 – It's Christmas Live (November 2020)
