= Sé Quién Eres Tú =

2016 Spanish-language album by Australian band Planetshakers

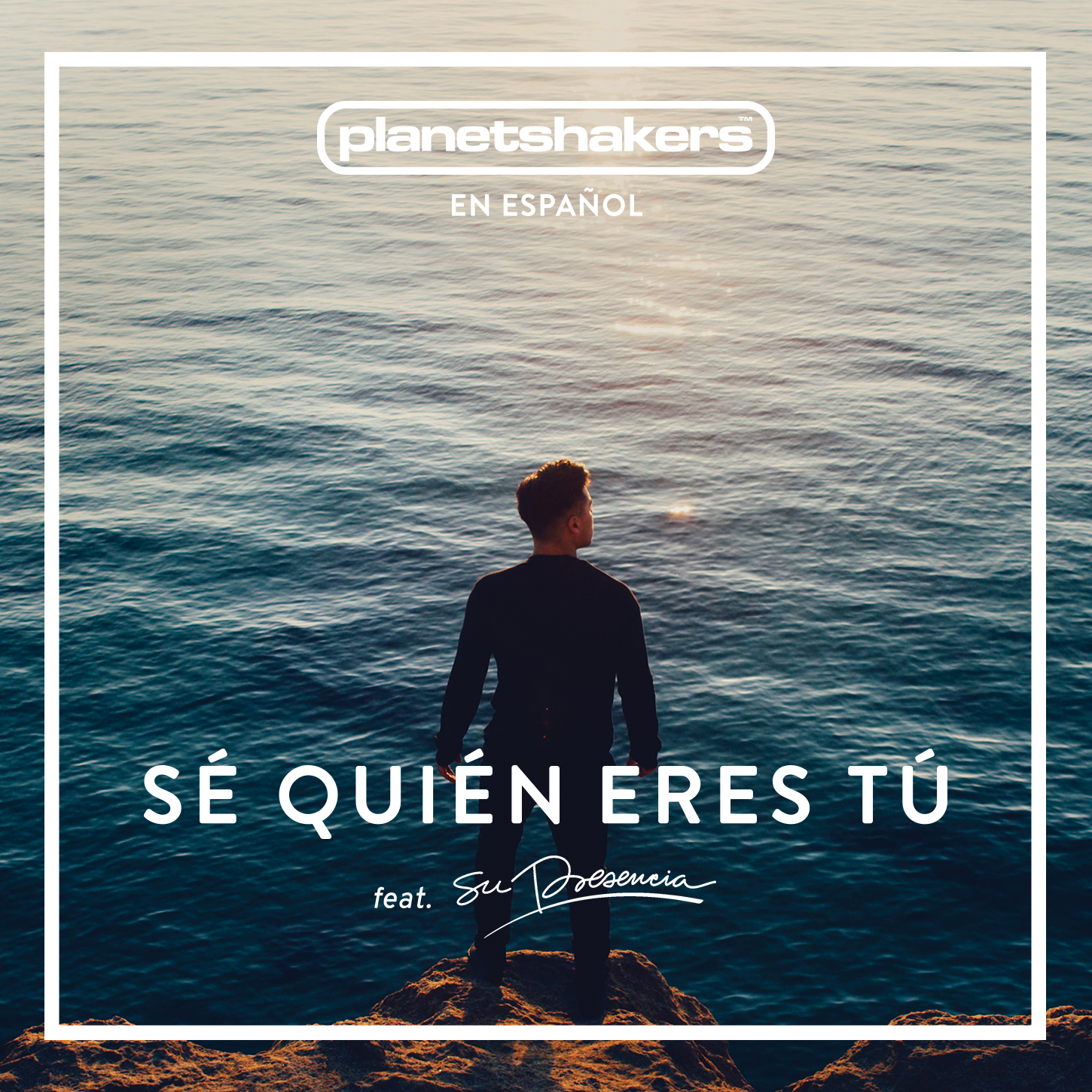

Studio album by Planetshakers featuring Su Presencia
- Released: November 11, 2016
- Recorded: 2016
- Venue: El Lugar de Su Presencia
- Genre: Worship, Latin Christian music
- Length: 48:00
- Language: Spanish
- Label: Planetshakers Ministries International, Integrity Music
- Producer: Joth Hunt

Planetshakers chronology
Overflow: Live (2016)	Sé Quién Eres Tú (2016)	Legacy (2017)

Planetshakers in Spanish chronology
Nada Es Imposible (2014)	Sé Quién Eres Tú (2016)	Legado (2017)

Singles from Sé Quién Eres Tú
- 1. "Ven Aquí" Released: November 4, 2016

Sé Quién Eres Tú (English: I Know Who You Are) featuring Su Presencia is the second album in Spanish by Australian contemporary worship band Planetshakers. The album was released on November 11, 2016 by Planetshakers Ministries International and Integrity Music. They worked with Joth Hunt in the production of this album.

== Background ==
Planetshakers through their social networks announced their album in Spanish on November 11, 2016. "We are excited to share 'Sé Quién Eres Tú' with our Spanish-speaking brothers and sisters around the world!" said Russell Evans, founder and senior pastor of Planetshakers. "And we have the honor of working with "Su Presencia" to achieve it! Our prayer is that these songs touch hearts for Jesus, encouraging, strengthening, empowering and equipping christians." Unlike his first Spanish album "Nada Es Imposible", the album Sé Quién Eres Tú is performed by the singers of the Colombian Christian band "Su Presencia" and Pastor Danilo Montero, who participated in the single, "#LetsGo". As producer of the album, Joth Hunt had the mission of giving a particular sound to each song. That's why he put in "Come Right Now" an "iconic" sound, as he calls it, to catch people from the beginning. This was achieved with a riser, a sound effect made with a synthesizer, which lets you know what song it is as soon as it sounds. One day BJ Pridham, a Planetshakers vocalist, showed Joth Hunt, also the lead vocalist and guitarist of the band, a track that was playing on the radio. Both were struck by funky bass riffs (a musical phrase that is often repeated) and some dance elements. "It would be great to write a song of praise like this," they said. "We use the sound and go directly to the verse, which focuses on the slap bass" (technique in which the bass strings are struck against the fretboard), explains Joth Hunt, who highlights the work of Josh Ham, bassist of the band, in this single. Henry González, vocalist of the ministry of praise "Su Presencia", interprets Ven Aquí, the version of "Come Right Now" in Spanish, which was translated by the members of the Bogota group.

== Promotion ==
The first track of the album, "Ven Aquí" (featuring Su Presencia), was released on November 4, 2016 as the first single, when the pre-order of the album began.

== Awards and accolades ==
In the 2017 the album Sé Quién Eres Tú (featuring Su Presencia) was nominated for a Dove Award in the category "Spanish Language Album of the Year" at the 48th Annual GMA Dove Awards.

Planetshakers (featuring Su Presencia) have been nominated by the Arpa Awards (México, 2016) in the category: "Best song in participation" "Sé quién eres tú" (2016).

== Track listing ==
NOTE: These songs are Spanish-language translations of Planetshakers songs in English. The original English-language song is listed next to each title.

Sé Quién Eres Tú
No.	Title	Writer(s)	Length
1.	"Ven Aquí (Come Right Now)" (featuring Su Presencia)	Joth Hunt, Brian "BJ" Pridham	3:23
2.	"#LETSGO" (featuring Su Presencia)	Samantha Evans, Joth Hunt	4:01
3.	"Se Trata De Ti (All About You)" (featuring Su Presencia)	Joth Hunt	3:25
4.	"Sé Quién Eres Tú (I Know Who You Are)" (featuring Su Presencia)	Mitch Wong	3:49
5.	"Con Solo Un Toque (Just One Touch)" (featuring Su Presencia)	Joth Hunt, Brian "Bj" Pridham	6:18
6.	"Te Quiero A Ti (I Just Want You)" (featuring Su Presencia)	Joth Hunt	4:43
7.	"Momentum (Live)" (featuring Su Presencia)	Sam Evans, Joth Hunt	3:44
8.	"Nuevo Tiempo (New Era)" (featuring Su Presencia)	Josh Ham, Andy Harrison, Joth Hunt, Brian "BJ" Pridham	3:49
9.	"Frente A Frente (Face To Face)" (featuring Su Presencia)	Steph Ling, Mitch Wong	5:42
10.	"Hogar (Home)" (featuring Su Presencia)	Israel Houghton, Brian "Bj" Pridham	5:05
11.	"Glorioso Encuentro (Glorious Collision)" (featuring Su Presencia)	Joth Hunt	3:55
Total length:			48:00

== Personnel ==
Adapted from AllMusic.

- Planetshakers – primary artist
- Juan David Muñoz – vocals, vocal producer
- Tuti Vega – vocals
- Danilo Montero – vocals
- Christy Corson – vocals
- Henry Gonzalez – vocals
- Diana Julio – vocals
- Germán Mariño – vocals
- Daniela Reyes – vocals
- Germán Malagón – vocals
- Juliana Serra – vocals
- Cindy Villabón – vocals
- Nora Zamora – vocals
- Joth Hunt – songwriter, percussion, producer
- Samantha Evans – songwriter
- Brian "BJ" Pridham – songwriter
- Andy Harrison – songwriter
- Israel Houghton – songwriter
- Mitch Wong – songwriter
- Steph Ling – songwriter
- Josh Ham – songwriter
- Joshua Brown – A&R, artist, vocal producer
- Adrian Thompson – A&R
- Andrés Corson – liner notes
- Samuel Rodriguez – liner notes
- Matthew Gray – Mastering
- Timothy Chew – design, illustrations
- Su Presencia – translation
- Russell Evans – executive producer
- C. Ryan Dunham – executive producer, liner notes
