= Winning Team: Live =

Winning Team

Live album by Planetshakers
- Released: July 19, 2024
- Recorded: January 2024
- Venues: Melbourne, Australia
- Genre: Worship
- Length: 70:00
- Labels: Planetshakers Ministries International, Venture3media
- Producer: Joth Hunt

Planetshakers chronology
Show Me Your Glory (Live at Chapel) (2023)	Winning Team (2024)	Winning Team: Songs for Church (Live) (2024)

Winning Team is a live album from Planetshakers, released by Planetshakers Ministries International and Venture3media on July 19, 2024. The album was produced by Joth Hunt and recorded live by the full Planetshakers band along with the voices of thousands attending the Planetshakers Conference 2024 in the Melbourne Convention and Exhibition Centre (MCEC), Winning Team is Planetshakers’ response to the victory found in Jesus.

== Critical reception ==
Professional ratings
Review scores
Source	Rating
Never for Nothing	7/10 stars
Amazon.com	positive

Awarding the album seven out of ten rating upon the album at Never for Nothing, Dave Deeks says, "There are a number of strong melodies here, delivered by a proficient worship band and with vocals clearly heard, and Planetshakers fans will no doubt find this release a welcome addition to their growing collection. The problem for me is that it all has a bit too much of a ‘formulaic worship song factory vibe’ about it, so I think a fair rating is 7/10."

A staff editor at Amazon gave the album a relatively positive review, writing, Winning Team (Live), "This inspiring album captures the energy and passion of a dedicated group coming together as one. The uplifting melodies and thought-provoking lyrics will ignite your spirit and remind you of the strength found within a united front."

== Track listing ==
No.	Title	Writer(s)	Length
1.	"Praise On It"	Andy Harrison / Josh Ham	3:54
2.	"Reasons To Praise"	Joth Hunt	2:38
3.	"Winning Team"	Andy Harrison / Josh Ham	3:37
4.	"Resurrection And Life"	Andy Harrison / Samantha Evans	3:02
5.	"Wash Over Me"	Joth Hunt	7:49
6.	"Overflow Of Worship"	Joth Hunt	9:08
7.	"We Want More"	Joth Hunt	5:01
8.	"Spirit Of God (Breathe In Us)"	Joth Hunt / Andy Harrison	8:23
9.	"Delight"	Andy Harrison / Josh Ham	4:10
10.	"Presence"	Joth Hunt	4:18
11.	"The Greatest Name"	Joth Hunt	7:26
12.	"You Have My Heart"	Joth Hunt	6:53
13.	"Send Me"	Sam Evans / Henry Seeley	4:17
Total length:			70:00

== Winning Team Tour 2024 ==
Planetshakers released a Spanish single called "Equipo Ganador" feat. Su Presencia on October 11, 2024. and also announced a tour of South America. Through their social media channels, published the list of South American countries participating in the 2024 Winning Team Tour: Colombia, Ecuador, Peru, Bolivia, Brazil and Chile

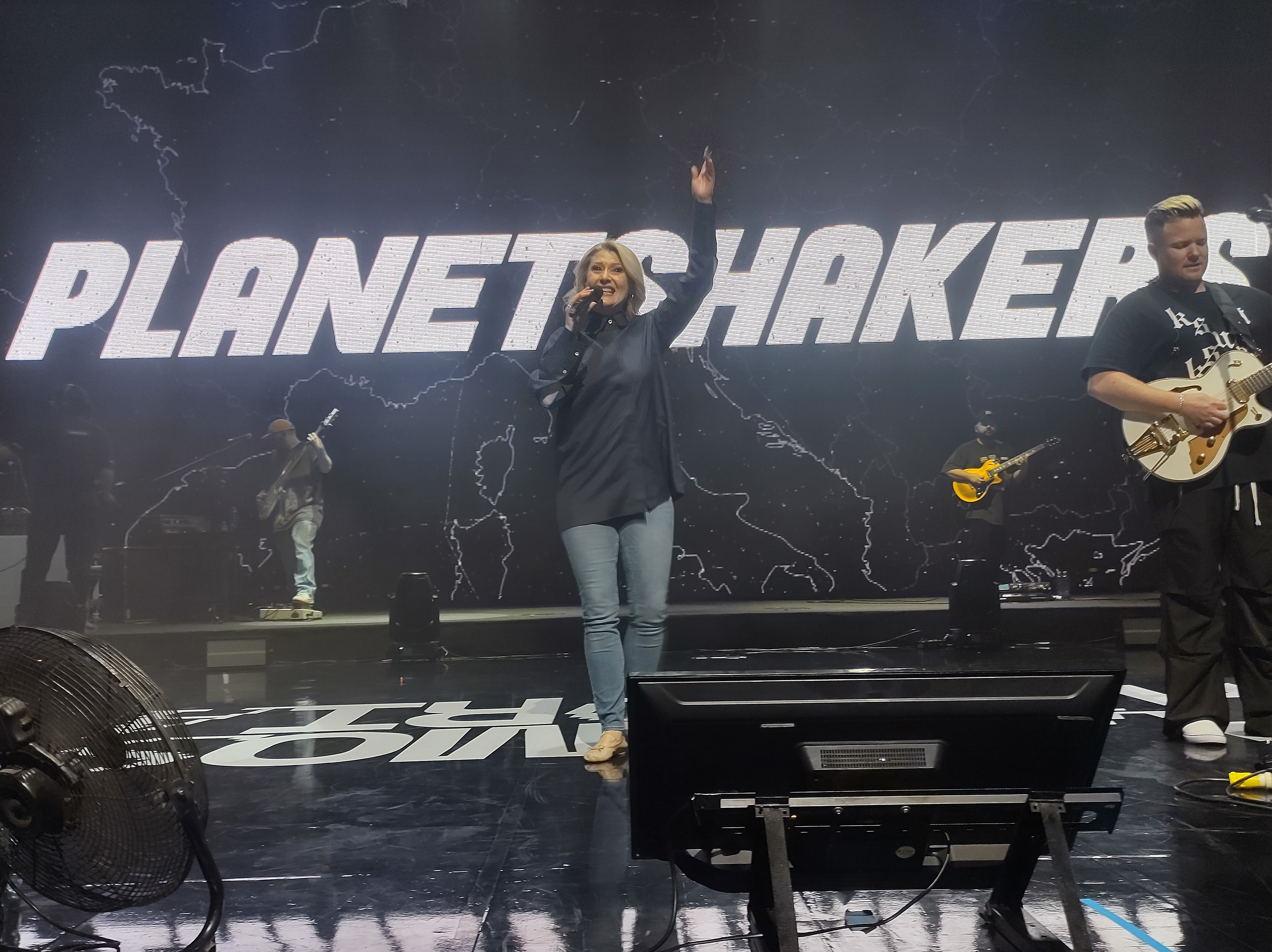
Planetshakers in Lima Peru 2024

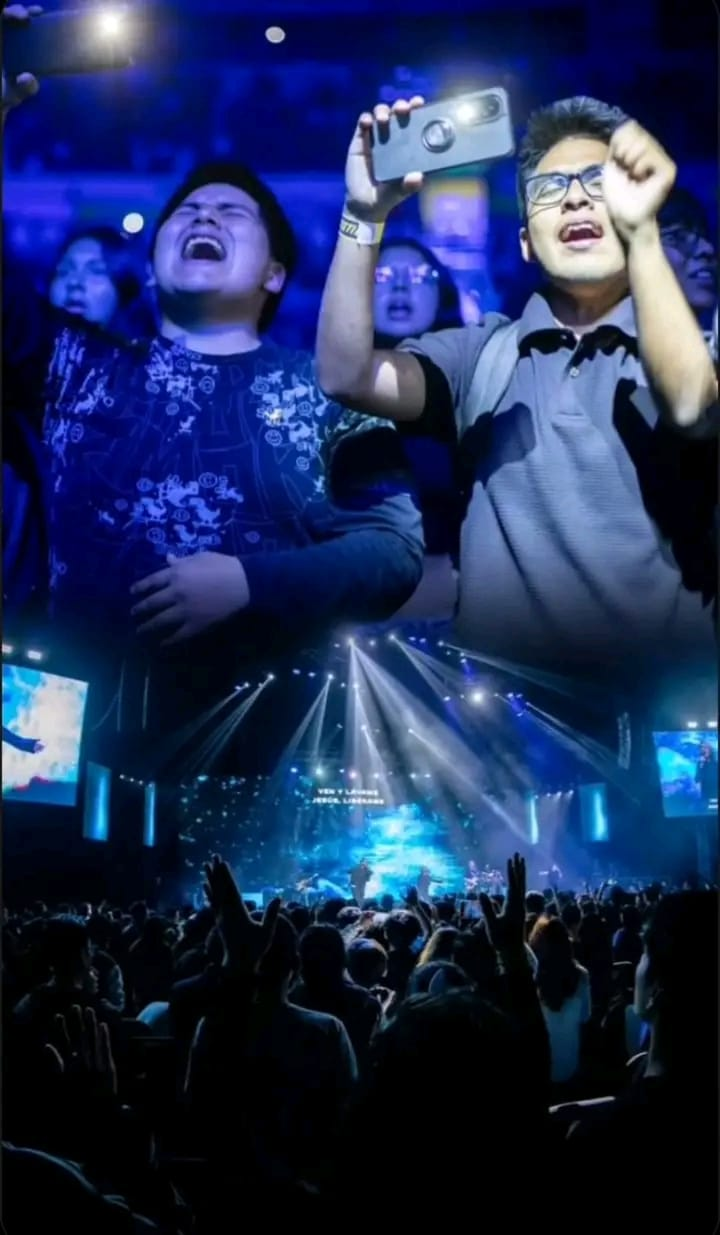
Planetshakers Live Peru tour "Winnig Team"

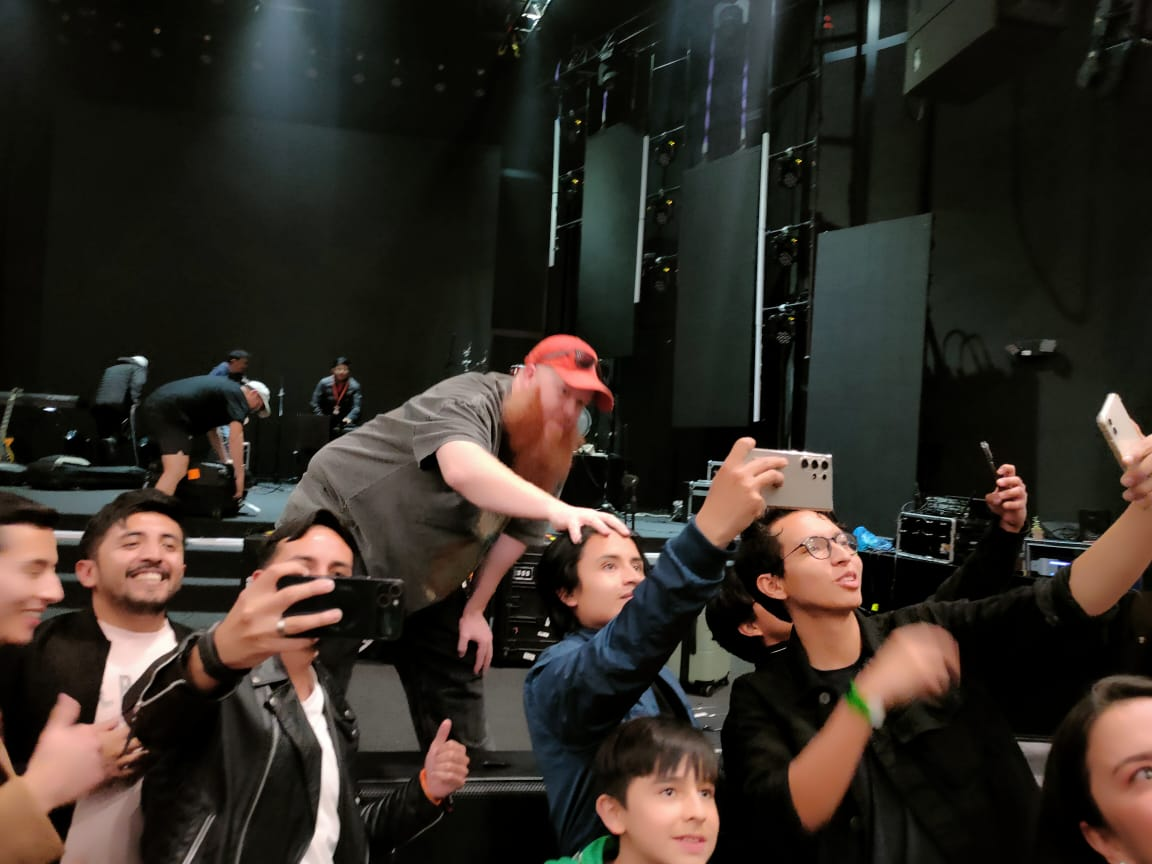
Planetshakers Live Ecuador – Winning Team South America Tour

== Personnel ==
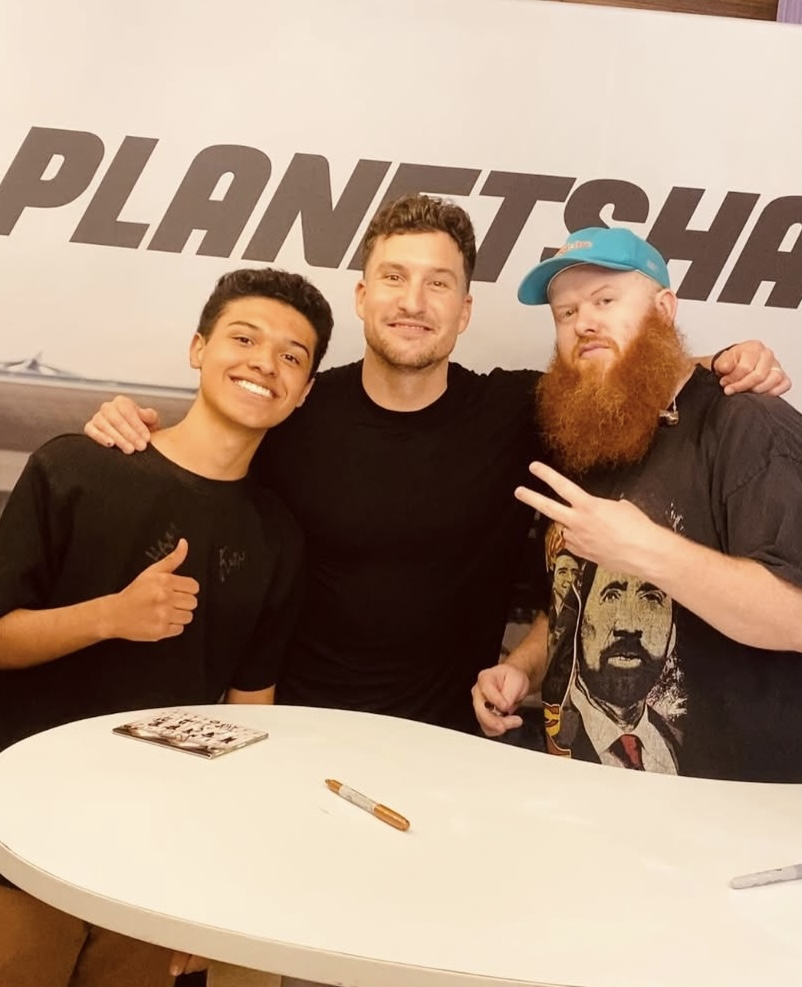
Winning Team South America Tour in Colombia

- Planetshakers – primary artist
- Jonathan Hunt – Worship leader, A&R, guitar, mixing, producer
- Andy Harrison, Josh Ham, Joth Hunt, Samantha Evans, Henry Seeley – songwriters
- Samantha Evans – Worship leader, executive producer
- Noah Walker – Worship leader
- Aimee Walker – Worship leader
- Rudy Nikkerud – Worship leader, acoustic guitar
- Chelsi Nikkerud – Worship leader
- Irichell Cajes – Worship leader
- Kundai Mudziviri – Worship leader
- Andy Harrison – drums
- Jonathan Evans – percussion
- Josh Monk – bass
- Michael Yadao – guitar
- Zach Kellock – guitar
- Austin – acoustic guitar
- Nicky Seow – keyboards
- Lloyd Smyth – keyboards
- Terence Ong – Production Manager, FOH Engineer
- Matt Wong – keyboards, Production Manager, Production Designer
- Alvin Hiew Monitor Assistant Lupiya Mujala – Monitor Engineer
- Dave Pike – Lighting Engineer
- Julian Williams – Lighting Assistant
- Terry Kay – LED Tech
- Ejuen Lee, Maca Vangegas – Stage Manager
- Trisha Ting – Stage Assists
- Terence Ong, Matt Wong, Dave Pike, Terry Kay, Julian Williams, Ben Hogarth, Felicity Shalless, Alvin Hiew, Moses Chua, Faith Lo, Dave Tenkate, Maverick Syn, Jonathan Lau, Marcus Lim, Florence Hung, Josh Creek, Merlene Hutt, Will Thomas, Lok Yuong Yong, Raj Kumar, Elia Ruff, Jeremiah Paynter, Christopher Preuss, Sam Lithgow, Jun Long, Jordan Lim, Sophie Rajakariar, Alex Chen – Set Construction
- Micaela Elliott, Alex Chu, Michael Wendt Artwork & Design Daryl Chia & Joth Hunt – Motion Graphics
- Joth Hunt & Daniel Porter – Project Coordinator
- Tarini Strangio, Kyle Van Huffel, Samara Lingham, Beatrice Valencia, Coretta Nyoka, Janelle Tan – Dancers
- Peter John, Joth Hunt – Live Video Directors
- Alex Chu, Micaela Elliott Hiew, Peter John – Video Editors
- Alex Chu, Brandon Nee, Caroline Pytlowany, Christel Chia, CJ Phillips, Damian Wong, Jevan Tan, Louis Lim, Max Norris, Michael Pilmer, Michael Wendt, Olly Allars, Nicole Harsono Chia, Rachel Rajesh, Ryan Smith, Shawn Chia, Tiffany Lai – Camera Operators
- Ernie Yap, Ruby Pover, Xueni Chin – Camera Operator Assistants
- Kellie Barley, Seth Rakers – Jib Operators
- Micaela Elliott Hiew – Data Wranglers
- Chris Peterson, Mike Ooi, Shea John – Data Wrangler Technician
- Daryl Chia, Justin Soh, Ally Chai, Christine Thye, Constance Chan, Darren Spielberg Lienardo, Darryl Heng, Ernest Lew, Eugene Soo, Isaac Lim, Jonathan Shia, Luca Torcasio, Marilyn Lau, Nathaniel Chee, Natthanicha Uthayan, Nicholas Liao, Nicole Chew, Timothy Wee, Wei Xiong Yap – Photographers
- Russell Evans – executive producer
- Sam Lithgow, Terence Ong – Live Recording
