= Legacy (Planetshakers album) =

2017 album from the Planetshakers

Live album by Planetshakers
- Released: 15 September 2017
- Recorded: 2017
- Venue: Hisense Arena, Melbourne, Australia Smart Araneta Coliseum, Manila, Philippines Sunway Pyramid Convention Centre, Kuala Lumpur, Malaysia
- Genre: Worship
- Length: 72:05
- Label: Planetshakers Ministries International, Integrity Music
- Producer: Joth Hunt

Planetshakers chronology
| Sé Quién Eres Tú (2016) | Legacy (2017) | Legado (2017) |

Legacy is a live album from Planetshakers, recorded live at Planetshakers 20th Anniversary Conference in Melbourne, Australia and its sister conferences in Manila, Philippines and Kuala Lumpur, Malaysia in 2017. Planetshakers Ministries International and Integrity Music released the album on 15 September 2017. They worked with Joth Hunt in the production of this album.

== Critical reception ==
Professional ratings
Review scores
| Source | Rating |
|---|---|
| Louder Than the Music | 4/5 stars |

Signaling in a four star review for Louder Than the Music, Jono Davies states, "This is like worship music that's had more than a few energy drinks. Even if you are not in the mood for high energy worship music, still put this on, this album and its tracks are infectious."

== Track listing ==
| No. | Title | Writer(s) | Length |
|---|---|---|---|
| 1. | "Alive Again (Live in Manila)" | Samantha Evans / Joth Hunt | 4:12 |
| 2. | "Through It All (Live in Melbourne)" | Joth Hunt | 4:18 |
| 3. | "Prophesy (Live in Melbourne)" | Andy Harrison | 4:21 |
| 4. | "We Speak Life (Live in Melbourne)" | Joth Hunt | 8:34 |
| 5. | "Be My Vision (Live in Melbourne)" | Mitch Wong | 6:37 |
| 6. | "Here's My Life (Live in Melbourne)" | Sam Evans / Andy Harrison / Joth Hunt / Brian "Bj" Pridham | 6:57 |
| 7. | "You Call Me Beautiful (Live in Melbourne)" | Mitch Wong | 9:41 |
| 8. | "Passion (Live in Melbourne)" | Sam Evans / Joth Hunt / Brian "Bj" Pridham | 3:58 |
| 9. | "Drawing Closer (Live in Kuala Lumpur)" | Andy Harrison / Joth Hunt | 4:35 |
| 10. | "A Love I Know (Live in Melbourne)" | Joth Hunt | 8:45 |
| 11. | "All On the Altar (Live in Kuala Lumpur)" | Andy Harrison | 6:27 |
| 12. | "You Are Here (Live in Manila)" | Sam Evans / Andy Harrison / Joth Hunt / Brian "Bj" Pridham | 6:20 |
| Total length: | | | 74:55 |

== Chart performance ==
| Chart (2017) | Peak position |
|---|---|
| US Christian Album Sales (Billboard) | 30 |

== Legado ==
Planetshakers has also recorded a Spanish version of Legacy called Legado.

== Personnel ==
Adapted from AllMusic.

- Brendan Allen – stage manager
- Clarisa Allen – Assistant
- Melissa Bell – Assistant
- Brooks Bigsby – Camera Operator
- Jennifer Bourke – Project Coordinator, Stage Manager
- Joshua Brown – A&R, Artist Development
- Rachel Lamb Brown – Camera Operator
- Alice Burnell – Camera Operator
- Timothy Chew – Artwork, Cover Design, Design
- Daryl Chia – Photography
- Shawn Chia – Camera Operator, Photography
- Joseph Chuah – Photography
- Paul Collison – director, Lighting Director
- Tim Cruz – editing
- C. Ryan Dunham – executive producer
- Micaela Elliott – Assistant, Camera Operator, Design
- Aimee Evans – vocals
- Russell Evans – executive producer
- Samantha Evans – vocals, Cover Design, Producer
- Uli Flores – vocals
- Steve Sowden – vocals
- Resa Frost – vocals
- Matthew Gray – Mastering
- Josh Ham – bass
- Andy Harrison – drums
- Pei Ern Ho – Photography
- Simon Holt – Camera Operator
- Apple Huang – Photography
- Joth Hunt – vocals, Cover Design, Guitar, Mixing, Post Producer, Producer, Project Coordinator
- Dave Jaques – engineer
- Seba Joseph – Stage Assistant
- Terry Kay – Monitor Engineer
- Brandon Keenan – Camera Operator
- Zach Kellock – guitar
- Celestine Kho – Photography
- Elisa Kho – Photography
- Estelle Lam – Photography
- Ernest Liew – Photography
- Andy Lim – Photography
- Louis Lim – Photography
- Scott Lim – keyboards
- Sam Lithgow – Stage Assistant
- Melissa Lok – Stage Assistant
- Ern Wei Loy – Photography
- Dani Macleod – Photography
- Lupiya Mujala – Assistant
- Hannah Nikkerud – Photography
- Rudy Nikkerud – vocals, guitar (Acoustic)
- Chelsi Nikkerud – vocals
- Terence Ong – engineer, Production Manager
- Drew Pendleton – Camera Operator
- Chris Peterson – Authoring
- Yvette Piemontese – Photography
- Mike Pilmer – Camera Operator, Director, Editing, Producer
- Planetshakers – Primary Artist
- B.J. Pridham – guitar, vocals
- Natalie Ruiz – Vocals
- Naomi Seah – Photography
- Jasmine Sim – Photography
- Sarah Simpson – Photography
- Justin Soh – Photography
- Starsky Reyes – Photography
- David Strangio – Monitor Engineer, Vocals
- Mervyn Tan – Photography
- Ayden Teoh – Photography
- Adrain Thompson – A&R, Artist Development
- Caroline Tjung – Photography
- Natasha Tripodi – vocals
- Joe Vatucicila – vocals
- Chris Verner – Camera Operator
- Hayley Williams – Stage Assistant
- Alvin Wong – Photography
- Matt Wong – Production Manager
- Mitch Wong – keyboards
- Wei Xiong Yap – Photography
