= Legado =

2017 Spanish-language album by Australian band Planetshakers

Studio album by Planetshakers
- Released: November 24, 2017
- Recorded: 2017
- Studios: Planetshakers Studios in Melbourne, Australia
- Genres: Worship; Latin Christian music
- Length: 74:00
- Language: Spanish
- Labels: Planetshakers Ministries International, Integrity Music

Planetshakers chronology
Legacy (2017)	Legado (2017)	Heaven on Earth (2018)

Planetshakers in Spanish chronology
Sé Quién Eres Tú (2016)	Legado (2017)

Singles from Legado
- 1. "¡Profetizar!" Released: November 17, 2017

Legado is the third album in Spanish by Australian contemporary worship band Planetshakers. Legado was re-recorded in Spanish from the Legacy album. Unlike the album in English, Legado features one songs not featured on original album. Planetshakers Ministries International and Integrity Music released the album on November 24, 2017. They worked with Joth Hunt in the production of this album.

== Content ==
Volver A Vivir is a track-by-track re-recording of Alive Again, performed in the Spanish language. Russell Evans describes "There's an atmosphere that electrifies your spirit when you come together with the people of God to put action to faith, and that's always been the hallmark of every recording we've done." Legado is the group's third album in Spanish, following in the footsteps of the Dove Award-nominated recordings, Sé Quién Eres Tú and Nada Es Imposible. This album is produced by Joth Hunt. Legado includes songs including: Pasión, Declaro Vida, ¡Profetizar! and Me Llamas Hermosa with worship leaders Joth Hunt, Rudy Nikkerud and Sam Evans.

== Release and promotion ==
The band Planetshakers on November 17, 2017, released their new single ¡Profetizar! on the radio. The song was written by Planetshakers drummer Andy Harrison, the song is a bold statement of the authority God has given each of His Children to declare His Word and see the world transformed. "My prayer for this song is that listening to it, and particularly singing it, these words inspire you to begin to prophesy about your situations, about your destiny, about your health or whatever situation you are going through. God has not called us to be victims of those things ... I want to encourage you to get up with the Word of God in your mouth. Take the authority that God has given you, start to testify about those situations and see how they change", says Harrison. Planetshakers through their social networks announced the launch of their album in Spanish on November 24, 2017. In the video posted on Facebook, Lucía Parker, a Christian worship leader Salvadoran, appears rehearsing songs in Spanish with members of the Planetshakers band.

== Critical reception ==
Professional ratings
Review scores
Source	Rating
Amazon.com	positive

A staff editor at Amazon.com gave the album a relatively positive review, writing, "Planetshakers celebrates its 20th anniversary with Legado, a collection of new songs that capture the freedom of worship and the power of encounter."

== Track listing ==
NOTE: These songs are Spanish-language translations of Planetshakers songs in English. The original English-language song is listed next to each title.

Legado
No.	Title	Writer(s)	Worship leader(s)	Length
1.	"Volver a Vivir (Alive Again)"	Sam Evans / Joth Hunt	Joth Hunt	3:58
2.	"En Tempestad (Through It All)"	Joth Hunt	Joth Hunt	4:16
3.	"¡Profetizar! (Prophesy)"	Andy Harrison	Rudy Nikkerud	4:19
4.	"Declaro Vida (We Speak Life)"	Joth Hunt	Joth Hunt	7:06
5.	"Quiero Verte (Be My Vision)"	Mitch Wong	Samantha Evans	6:37
6.	"Aquí Estoy (Here's My Life)"	Sam Evans / Andy Harrison / Joth Hunt / Brian "Bj" Pridham	Chelsi Nikkerud	6:57
7.	"Me Llamas Hermosa (You Call Me Beautiful)"	Mitch Wong	Samantha Evans	6:35
8.	"Pasión (Passion)"	Sam Evans / Joth Hunt / Brian "Bj" Pridham	Joth Hunt	3:52
9.	"Yo Me Acerco (Drawing Closer)"	Andy Harrison / Joth Hunt	Joth Hunt	4:23
10.	"Sé Que Hay Un Amor (A Love I Know)"	Joth Hunt	Joth Hunt	8:43
11.	"En El Altar (All On the Altar)"	Andy Harrison	Chelsi Nikkerud	6:28
12.	"Tú Conmigo Estás (You Are Here)"	Sam Evans / Andy Harrison / Joth Hunt / Brian "Bj" Pridham	Samantha Evans	6:21
13.	"Incontenible (Overflow)"	Sam Evans / Joth Hunt	Joth Hunt	4:30
Total length:				74:00

== Personnel ==
Adapted from AllMusic.

- Planetshakers – primary artist
- Joth Hunt – Worship leader, guitar, mixing, composer, producer, cover design, project coordinator
- Samantha Evans – Worship leader, composer, cover design
- Rudy Nikkerud – Worship leader, guitar Acoustic
- Chelsi Nikkerud – Worship leader
- Juan Muñoz – vocals
- Lucía Parker – vocals
- Brian "BJ" Pridham – guitar, composer
- Andy Harrison – drums, composer
- Mitch Wong – keyboards, composer
- Josh Ham – Bass
- Scott Lim – keyboards
- Zach Kellock – guitar
- Matthew Gray – Mastering
- Joshua Brown – A&R, Artist development
- Adrian Thompson – A&R, Artist development
- Timothy Chew – artwork design, cover design
- Jennifer Bourke – project coordinator
- Jonathan Brown – executive producer
- Russell Evans – executive producer
