= Momentum (Live in Manila) =

EP by Planetshakers
- Released: 25 March 2016
- Recorded: 2016
- Venue: Smart Araneta Coliseum, Manila, Philippines
- Genre: Worship
- Length: 20:46
- Label: Planetshakers Ministries International, Integrity Music
- Producer: Joth Hunt

Planetshakers chronology
Lets Go (2015)	Momentum (Live in Manila) (2016)	Overflow: Live (2016)

Singles from Planetshakers
- 1. "I Know Who You Are" Released: May 11, 2016

Momentum (Live in Manila) is a live & studio EP from Planetshakers. Planetshakers Ministries International and Integrity Music released the album on 25 March 2016. The EP was recorded in Manila, at the Araneta Coliseum. This collection of songs were written and recorded over many months in Australia, Philippines and the United States. The song "I Know Who You Are" on the Billboard Christian Songs chart ranked #30.

== Critical reception ==
Professional ratings
Review scores
Source	Rating
365 Days of Inspiring Media	4/5 stars

Joshua Andre, in a four star review for 365 Days of Inspiring Media, wrote: "Overall an enjoyable album that has definitely continues my reinvigorated interest for Planetshakers a bit more; this album has certainly created momentum, and given me new songs to sing out to Jesus during times of joy and hardship.

== Track listing ==
No.	Title	Writer(s)	Length
1.	"Momentum" (live)	Joth Hunt / Samantha Evans	3:44
2.	"Nothing Is Impossible" (live)	Joth Hunt	4:19
3.	"I Know Who You Are"	Mitch Wong	3:48
4.	"Face to Face"	Mitch Wong / Steph Ling	5:40
5.	"Come Right Now"	BJ Pridham / Joth Hunt	3:24
6.	"Video Momentum" (live)		3:47
Total length:			21:00

== Charts ==
Momentum (Live in Manila) debuted at #4 on the iTunes Christian and Gospel Charts.

Chart (2016)	Peak position
Australian Independent Albums (AIR)	2
Australian Albums (ARIA)	20

== Singles ==
Chart (2016)	Peak position
US Hot Christian Songs (Billboard)	30
