= Nothing Is Impossible (Planetshakers song) =

Single by Planetshakers

from the album Nothing Is Impossible
- Released: August 9, 2011
- Recorded: 2010
- Genre: Contemporary worship music
- Length: 4:04
- Label: Planetshakers Ministries International, Integrity
- Songwriter: Joth Hunt
- Producer: Joth Hunt

Planetshakers singles chronology
"Nothing Is Impossible" (2011)	"The Anthem" (2012)

Music video
- "Nothing Is Impossible" on YouTube

"Nothing Is Impossible" is a song by Australian contemporary worship band Planetshakers. First appearing on their live album "Deeper" in 2009, it was then released on August 9, 2011, as the lead single from their live album, Nothing Is Impossible (2011). The song also appeared on the album on the Planetshakers Kids album Nothing Is Impossible (2013), on the album Nada Es Imposible (2014), on the album Outback Worship Sessions, on the album Momentum (Live in Manila) (2016), on the album Heaven on Earth, Part 3, on the album Heaven on Earth, on the album Deeper (2009) and it also appears in the album Beautiful Saviour (2008). The song was written by Joth Hunt.

== Composition ==
The song was written by Joth Hunt.

In 2011, Planetshakers released "Nothing Is Impossible". The song was recorded live, with Joth Hunt featuring Israel Houghton leading the worship song, and was included on the album Nothing Is Impossible (2011).

In 2014, Planetshakers released "Nada Es Imposible", which was recorded in the studio. Joth Hunt featuring Lucía Parker led the worship song, and it was included on the album Nada Es Imposible (2014), the band's first album in Spanish.

In the 2015, Planetshakers released "Nothing Is Impossible" in a pop style, with Hunt adding some more lyrics to the song. It was featured on the album Outback Worship Sessions.

In the 2016, Planetshakers released "Nothing Is Impossible" in an electronic style, which was featured on the album Momentum (Live in Manila).

In the 2018, Planetshakers released an EDM remix of "Nothing Is Impossible", which appears on the album Heaven on Earth.

== Critical reception ==
Russ Hutto of The Worship Community said "Nothing is Impossible" was a "great song", and thought that it "would work in any congregation and really builds the faith of the people in your congregation".

== Music video ==
The official music video for the song was released on June 17, 2015 and has garnered over 3 million views as of April 2021.

== Live performances ==
In May 2014, Planetshakers received an invitation from James Robinson of the American television program Life Today with James Robison to sing the song live. Planetshakers on November 10, 2015 visited the church El Lugar de Su Presencia in Colombia to sing the song "Nada Es Imposible" in Spanish. In October 2016, on invitation from Brian Johnson, the band visited Bethel Church in Redding, California where the band performed the song Nothing Is Impossible live.

== Covers and renditions ==
Nothing Is Impossible has been translated and interpreted in many evangelical churches around the world. This song has been covered by a number of Christian music artists including Gateway Worship led by the worship singer Matt Birkenfeld, Israel & New Breed, Marco Barrientos, Lakewood Church, El Lugar de Su Presencia among other artists.

On April 12, 2011, Indiana Bible College released the song Nothing Is Impossible from the album Your Name. On July 25, 2012, the Mexican Christian singer Marco Barrientos, released the Planetshakers song in Spanish Nada Es Imposible for the album "Ilumina" and the album Legado de Adoración (2016). On February 5, 2013 the band Quatro por Um released the song Nothing Is Impossible from the album Nada é Impossível. On March 23, 2014 the band Gateway Worship released the album My Sole Pursuit, on the album they include the song Nothing Is Impossible. In 2015 the colombian band of Su Presencia released Nada Es Imposible in an acoustic version. In 2023 the EDM Remix version was Re-recorded during a Sold-Out concert on September 8–11 in Manila/Pasay City, Philippines.

== Chart performance ==
Nothing Is Impossible also topped the corresponding Christian charts by Billboard.
