= Overflow: Live =

Live album by Planetshakers
- Released: September 30, 2016
- Recorded: 2016
- Venue: Hisense Arena, Melbourne, Australia
- Genre: Worship
- Length: 78:25
- Label: Planetshakers Ministries International, Integrity Music
- Producer: Joth Hunt

Planetshakers chronology
Lets Go (2015)	Overflow: Live (2016)	Sé Quién Eres Tú (2016)

Singles from Planetshakers
- 1. "I Know Who You Are" Released: May 11, 2016

Overflow: Live is a live album from contemporary worship band Planetshakers. Planetshakers Ministries International and Integrity Music released the album on September 30, 2016. The album was recorded live on Hisense Arena, Melbourne, Australia. They worked with Joth Hunt in the production of this album.

== Critical reception ==
Professional ratings
Review scores
Source	Rating
Louder Than the Music	5/5 stars
365 Days of Inspiring Media	4.5/5 stars
Worship Leader	4/5 stars
CCM Magazine	3/5 stars
Today's Christian Entertainment	3/5 stars
New Release Today	2/5 stars

Carolyn Aldis of The Louder Than the Music gave the album five out of five stars saying, This is a CD that will be on repeat in my home, a rollercoaster ride of an album, with dance songs that take you up to the top, push you over the edge, arms up, smile on your face as you rush deeper in, the twists and turns of the ride bringing a smile of wonder to your face, the beauty of the slower songs keeping you hanging in mid-air, soul in your throat, enjoying the closeness of God, far above the world.

Joshua Andre, specifying in a four and a half star review for 365 Days of Inspiring Media, replies, "Overall an enjoyable album that has definitely continues my reinvigorated interest for Planetshakers a bit more; this album has certainly created momentum."

Awarding the album four stars at Worship Leader, Jeremy Armstrong writes, "Overflow is filled with proclamation songs as well as personal praise to the God who is worthy".

Matt Conner, awarding the album three stars from CCM Magazine, describes the album as "another energetic, youthful live set steeped in experiential language ('I don’t care what it looks like, I’m diving in.') that longs for more of the Holy Spirit's work."

Giving the album three stars for Today's Christian Entertainment, Kelly Meade states, Planetshakers continues the trend of modern worship that has been at the forefront in recent years delivering music that directs the hearts of listeners to our Heavenly Father."

In a two star review in New Release Today, Kaitlyn Barbour describes, Every generation seems to be represented in this versatile collage of praise anthems from the Australian band's worshipful work of art.

== Awards and accolades ==
The video of the song "Overflow" was nominated for Dove Award Long Form Video of The Year 2016 at the 48th Annual GMA Dove Awards.

== Track listing ==
No.	Title	Writer(s)	Length
1.	"Come Right Now"	Joth Hunt / Brian "Bj" Pridham	3:48
2.	"River"	Joth Hunt	3:52
3.	"Overflow"	Samantha Evans / Joth Hunt	4:29
4.	"I Know Who You Are"	Mitch Wong	8:24
5.	"I Came For You"	Andy Harrison / Joth Hunt	7:25
6.	"Sings My Soul"	Mitch Wong	7:46
7.	"Heart Song"		2:55
8.	"I'm Free"	Andy Harrison / Joth Hunt	4:21
9.	"Give My All"	Andy Harrison / Joth Hunt	3:51
10.	"Precious To Me"	Andy Harrison	6:45
11.	"Face To Face"	Steph Ling / Mitch Wong	6:49
12.	"Join With the Angels"	Joth Hunt	6:04
13.	"My Fathers Child"	Brian "Bj" Pridham / Mitch Wong	4:04
14.	"Gotta Give Him Glory"	Joth Hunt	3:24
15.	"Here Comes the Revival (feat. Planetboom)"	Aimee Evans / Josh Ham / Andy Harrison / Joth Hunt / Mitch Wong	4:24
Total length:			78:25

== Chart performance ==
Chart (2016)	Peak position
Australian Albums (ARIA)	25
US Christian Albums (Billboard)	32
US Christian Album Sales (Billboard)	32

== Singles ==
Chart (2016)	Peak position
US Hot Christian Songs (Billboard)	30
