= I Know Who You Are (song) =

Single by Planetshakers

from the album Overflow: Live
- Released: May 11, 2016
- Recorded: 2015
- Studio: Planetshakers Studios in Melbourne, Australia
- Genre: Worship
- Length: 7:40
- Label: Planetshakers Ministries International, Integrity Music
- Songwriter(s): Mitch Wong
- Producer(s): Ian Eskelin

Planetshakers singles chronology
"Covered" (2014)	"I Know Who You Are" (2016)	"Heaven on Earth" (2018)

Music video
- "I KNOW WHO YOU ARE" on YouTube

"I Know Who You Are" is a song by Australian contemporary worship band Planetshakers. It was released on May 11, 2016, as the single from their live album, Overflow: Live (2016). The song was written by Mitch Wong. It appeared on the EP Momentum (Live in Manila) and also the Spanish album Sé Quién Eres Tú.

== Background ==
"I Know Who You Are" was written by Mitch Wong and produced by Ian Eskelin, has been available from May 11, 2016 on all streaming and digital retail platforms and added on AC and radio CHR. After adding the song to the radio it reached No. 30 on the Billboard Hot Christian Songs chart.

== Music videos ==
The official music video for the song was released on September 28, 2016 and has garnered over 410 thousand views as of January 2021.

== Charts ==
Chart (2016)	Peak position
US Hot Christian Songs (Billboard)	30

== Release history ==
Region	Date	Format	Label	Ref.
United States	June 10, 2016	Christian radio	Planetshakers Ministries International; Integrity Music	
