= Planetshakers =

Australian contemporary worship music band

- Planetshakers Live at Gosper Fest 2.0 in Multiespacio Costa 21, Lima (2026)

Background information
- Origin: Adelaide, South Australia, Australia
- Genres: Contemporary worship music, contemporary Christian music
- Years active: 1997–present
- Labels: Planetshakers Ministries International, Integrity, Venture3Media
- Website: planetshakers.com

Planetshakers is a contemporary worship music band, a central part of Planetshakers Church in Melbourne, Australia.

Music is a major expression of Planetshakers’ global ministry.

The mandate of Planetshakers — “Empowering Generations to Win Generations” — is outworked globally through the ministry of the Planetshakers Band.

The mission behind Planetshakers Music is to see every generation empowered by a life-transforming personal encounter with God through the experience of authentic praise and worship.

Planetshakers Band serves the local church while also ministering internationally through music, worship events, conferences and tours.

Planetshakers music is characterised by passionate praise, contemporary worship, energetic live performances and a strong emphasis on encountering the Presence of God.

With over 60 albums, the band toured annually to the US, UK, Europe, South Africa, Asia, South America, Australia and New Zealand for some years, and has been nominated for several Dove Awards.

== History ==
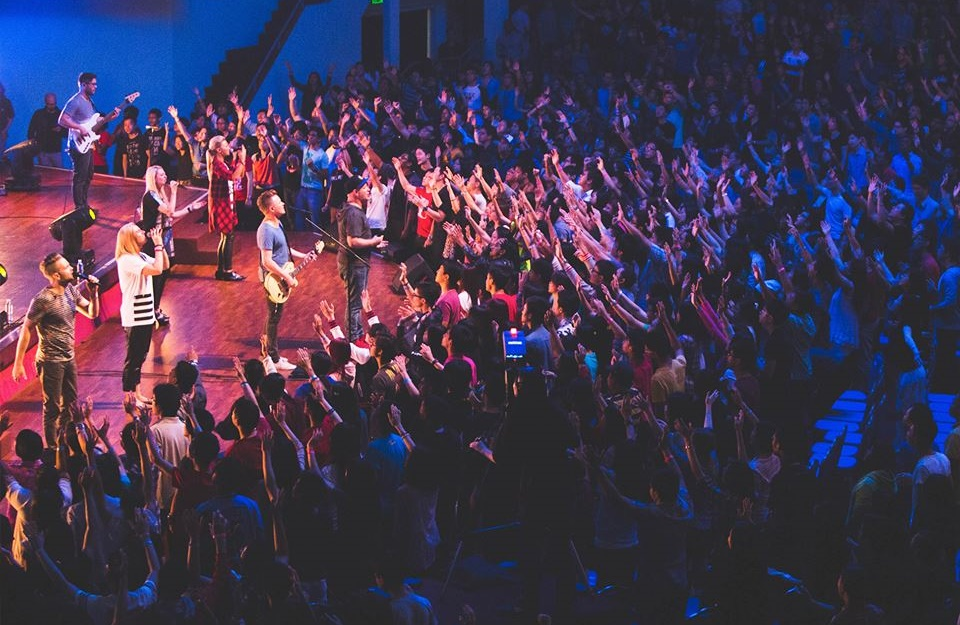
The Planetshakers band in its early days

Formed in Adelaide, South Australia, for the first Planetshakers Conference at Paradise Community Church (now known as Futures Church) in Adelaide in 1997, the band is now based in Melbourne, Victoria at Planetshakers Church, which is under the leadership of senior pastors Russell and Samantha Evans.

Guy Sebastian, member of the Planetshakers band from 2002 to 2005, was a worship leader and background vocals, recording albums for Planetshakers Church at Paradise Community Church conferences. He went on to win the first Australian Idol and has become a highly popular artist.

=== Michael Guglielmucci ===
It was reported in 2008 that Michael Guglielmucci, a pastor at the church and former bass player in the Planetshakers band, had fraudulently claimed he was dying of cancer, and received money from supporters who believed his illness was real. He wrote "Healer", a song of encouragement for believers who were suffering from cancer, for the album Saviour of the World, which was released in June (2007). Guglielmucci explained his actions as being a result of a long-term pornography addiction. The track had also been added to the Hillsong album This Is Our God (2008), but later removed from the album.

== Members ==
The following are current and former members:

Current

- Jonathan Hunt – music director, worship leader, electric guitar, keyboard, piano (2005–present)
- Samantha Evans – worship leader, background vocals (2000-present)
- Brian "BJ" Pridham – worship leader, background vocals, acoustic guitar, electric guitar (2009-present)
- Steve Sowden – worship leader, background vocals
- Joe Vatucicila – worship leader, background vocals (2007-present)
- Natasha Ham – worship leader, background vocals (2015-present)
- Aimee Walker – worship leader, background vocals (2014-present)
- Noah Walker – worship leader, background vocals (2018-present)
- Andy Harrison – drums (2007–present), worship leader
- Scott Lim – keyboard, piano (2006-present)
- Nicky Seow – keyboard, piano
- Josh Ham – bass guitar (2010-present)
- Jesse McCarthy – electric guitar (2007-present)
- Kuo Hao Tah - electric guitar (2007-present)
- Zach Kellock – electric guitar (2015-present)
- Will Broome – electric guitar/vocals (2013-present)
- Jonathan Evans – percussion, drums (2015-present)
- Dom O'Brien - Worship Leader/Vocals (2023-Present)

Former

- David Evans - worship leader, (1997-1999)
- Henry Seeley – worship leader, background vocals, electric guitar, acoustic guitar (2000-2012)
- Rudy Nikkerud – worship leader, background vocals, acoustic guitar, pastor (2004-2024)
- Chelsi Nikkerud – worship leader, background vocals (2009-2024)
- Guy Sebastian (2002–2005) – worship leader, background vocals
- Mike Guglielmucci (2000-2008) – bass
- Kris Guglielmucci (2000-2008, died 2016) – lead guitar
- Mark Peric – bass guitar (2007–2014)
- Mike Webber (2000-2014) – drums
- Liz Webber (2007-2014) – background vocals
- Mitch Wong – keyboard, piano, songwriter (until 2020)
- Steph Wong – worship leader, background vocals (until 2020)
- Uli Flores – worship leader, background vocals (until 2019)

== Awards ==
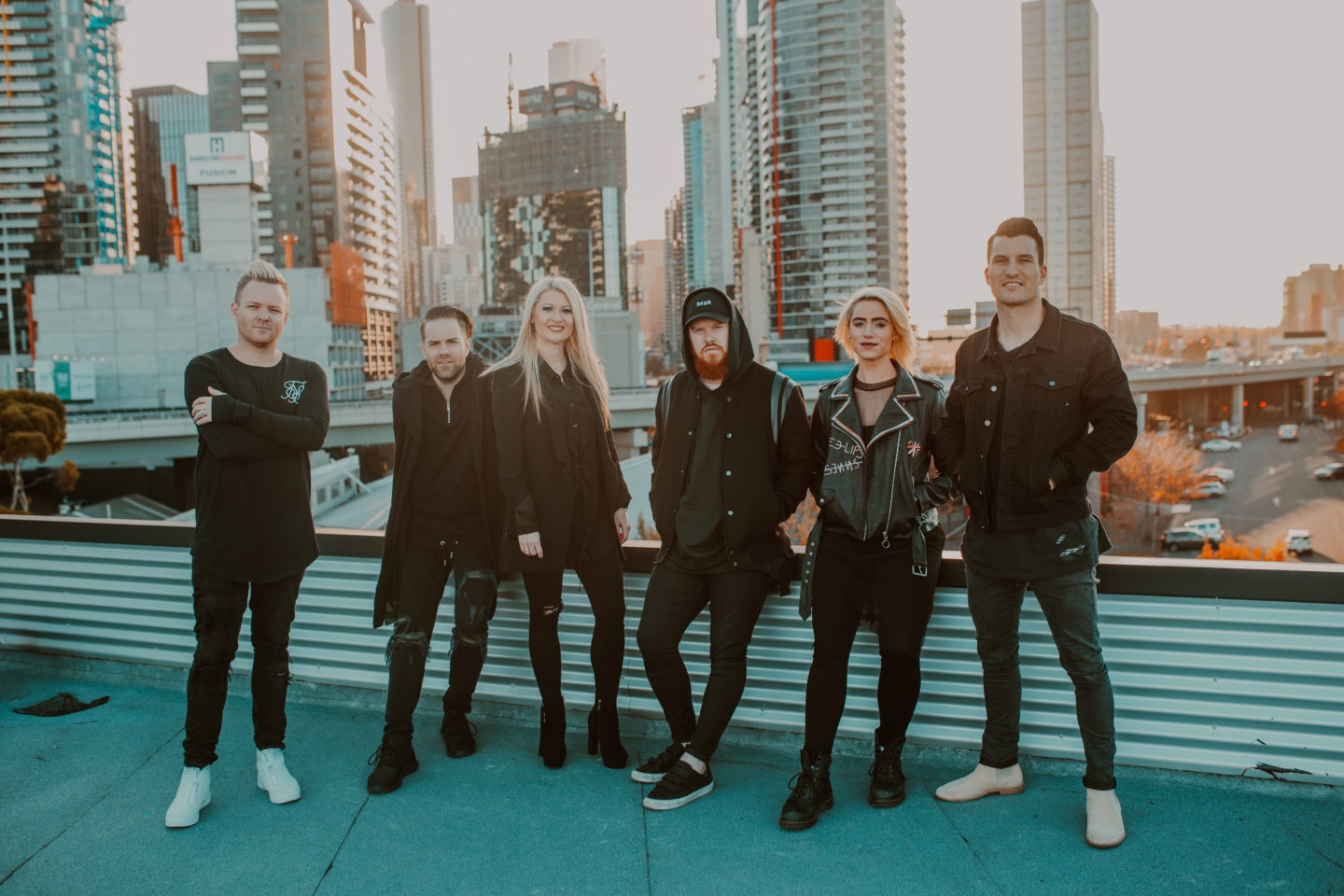
The Planetshakers band

In 2002, the album Open Up the Gates, was nominated for Dove Award "Worship Album of the Year".

Endless Praise: Live, released in March 2014, reached No. 3 on the Billboard Top Heatseekers chart and No. 16 in on the Billboard Christian Albums chart. The video of the song "Endless Praise" was nominated for Dove Award Long Form Video of the Year 2014.

The album, Nada Es Imposible, in Spanish which was released in June 2014, reached position No. 17 on the Billboard "Latin Pop Albums" chart and was nominated by the Arpa Awards in three categories: best group or duo album, album rock or hard rock and producer of 2014.

The video of the song "This is Our Time" was nominated for the Dove Award Long Form Video of the Year 2014.

The video of the song "Let's Go" was nominated for the Dove Award Long Form Video of the Year 2015.

The video of the song "Overflow" was nominated for Dove Award Long Form Video of the Year 2016.

Planetshakers was nominated for the Dove Award in the category: "Spanish Language Album of the Year" for Sé Quién Eres Tú (featuring Su Presencia).

Planetshakers (featuring Su Presencia) have been nominated by the Arpa Awards in 2016 in the category: "Best song in participation" "Sé quién eres tú".

== Discography ==
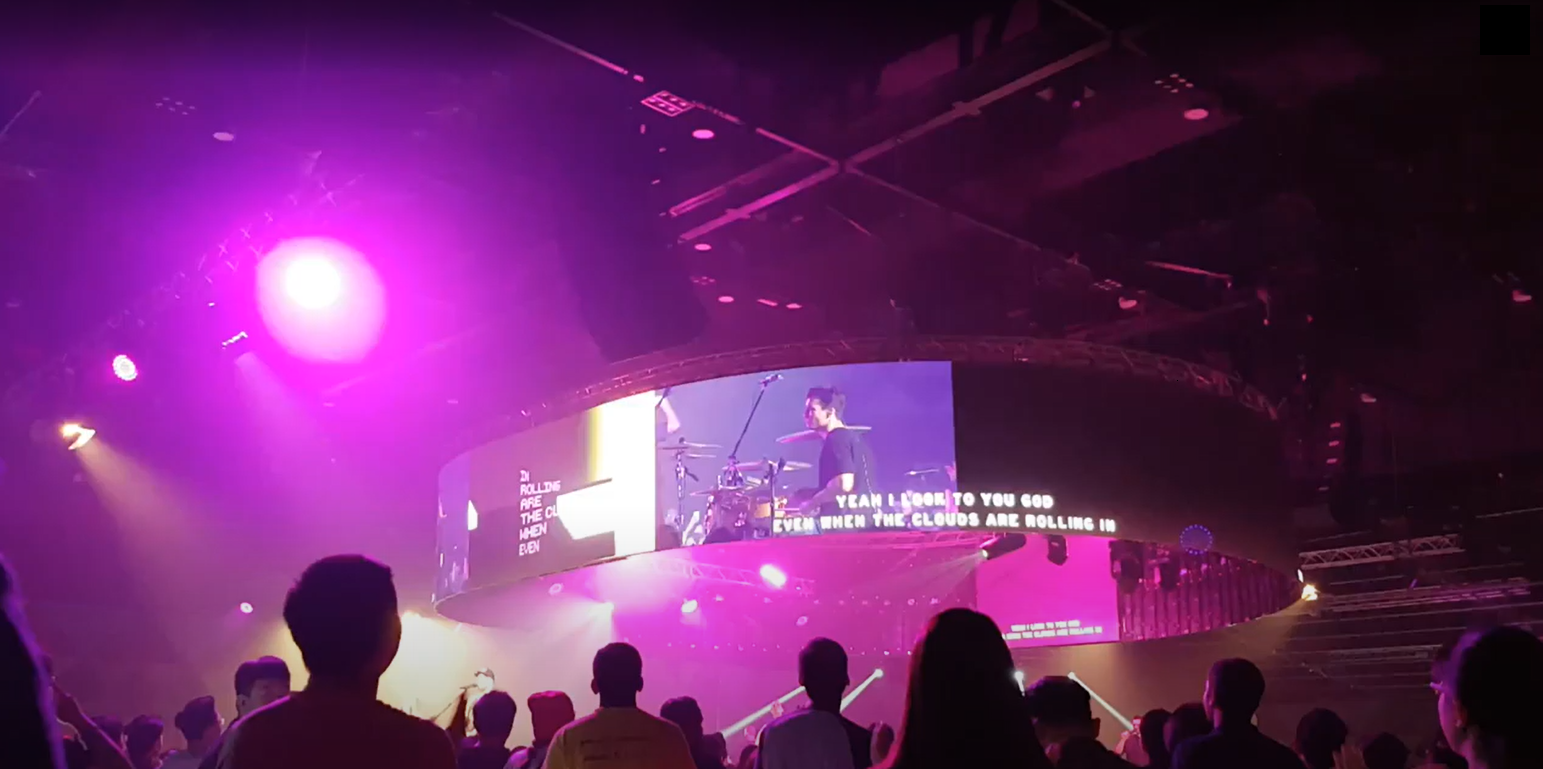
Photo taken during Planetshakers conference in Kuala Lumpur in 2019.

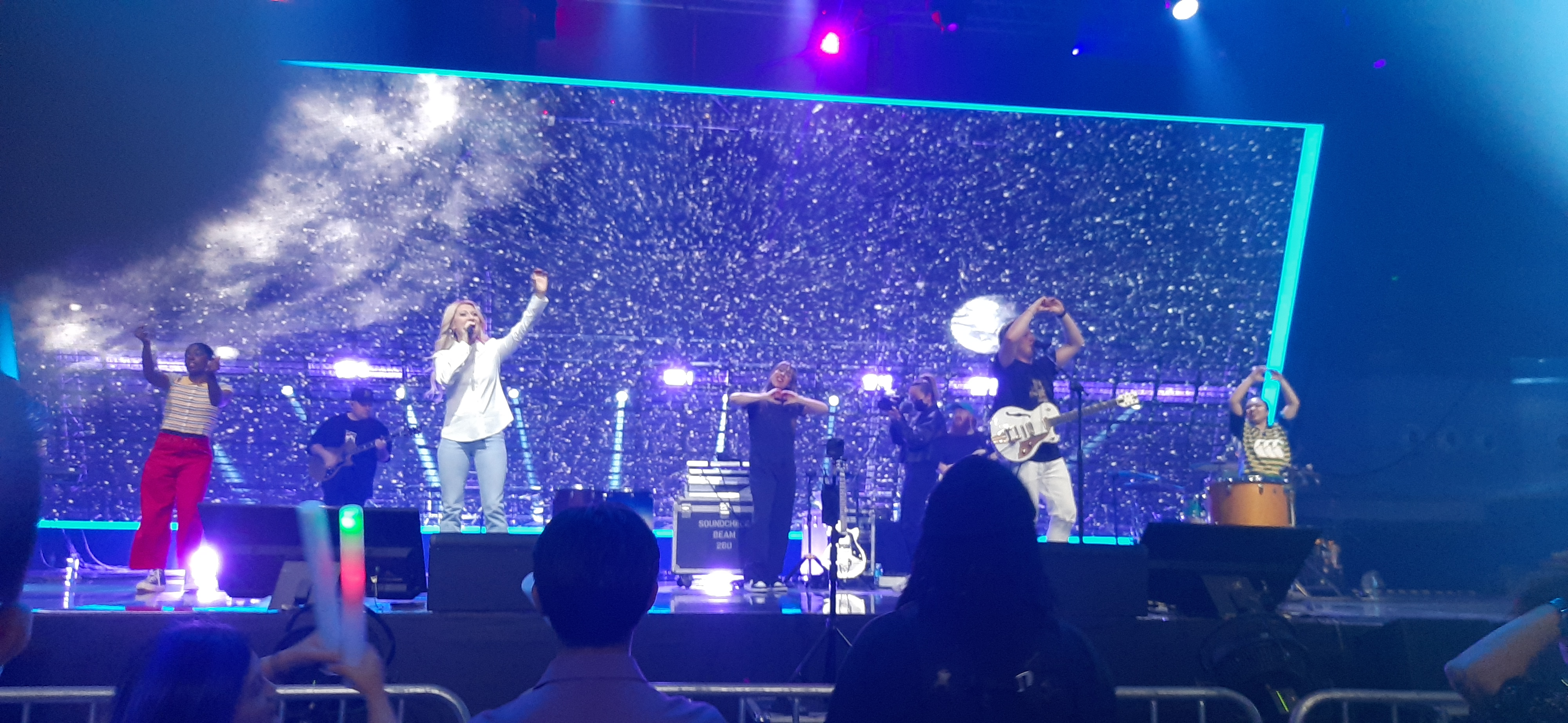
Planetshakers' Performs Endless Praise In SM Mall of Asia Arena on September 8 to 11, 2022.

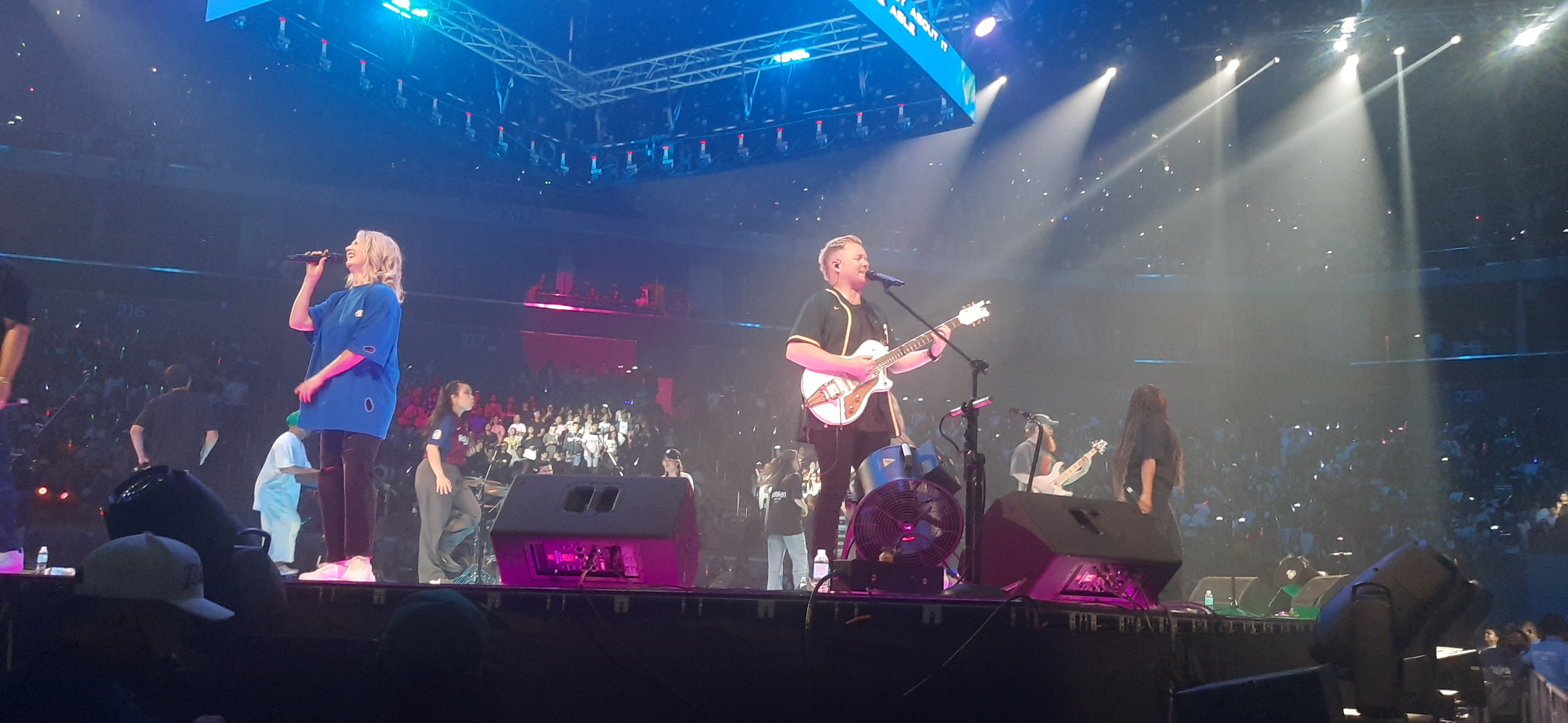
Planetshakers' Second event at SM Mall of Asia Arena on July 21 to 23, 2023.

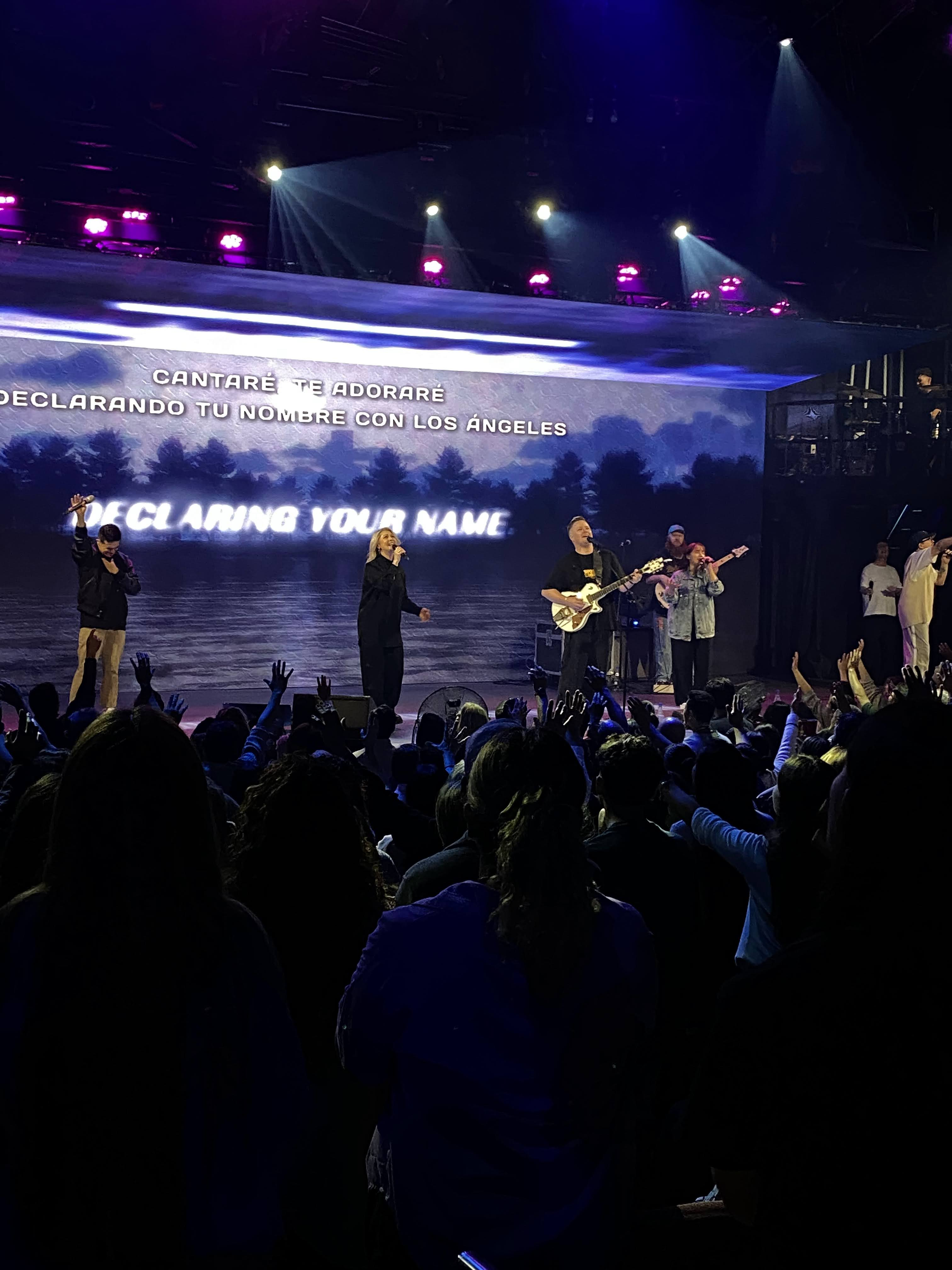
Planetshakers in Colombia “Tour Winning Team South America” October 16, 2024

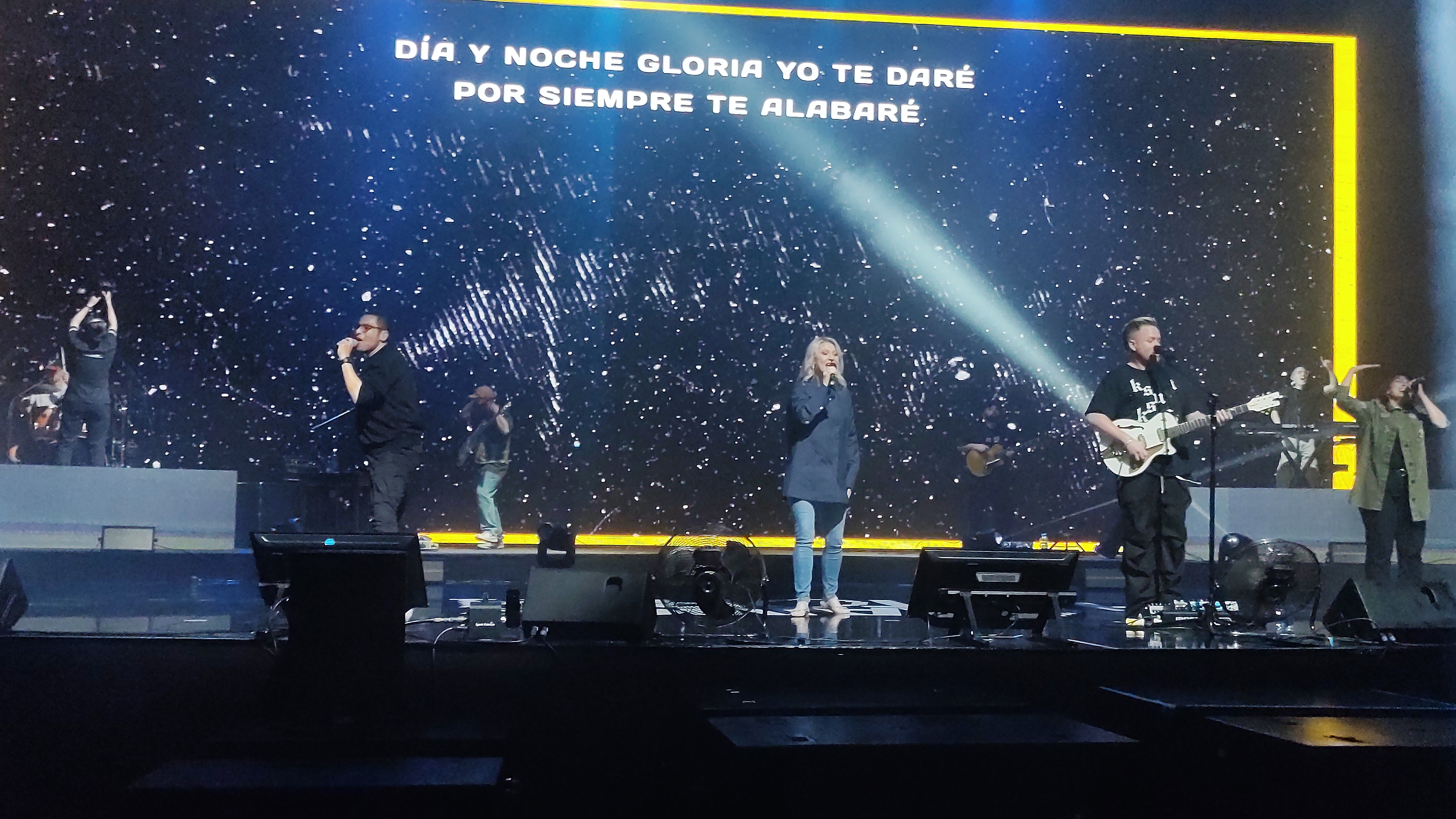
Planetshakers in Lima Peru Tour "Winning Team" on October 19, 2024

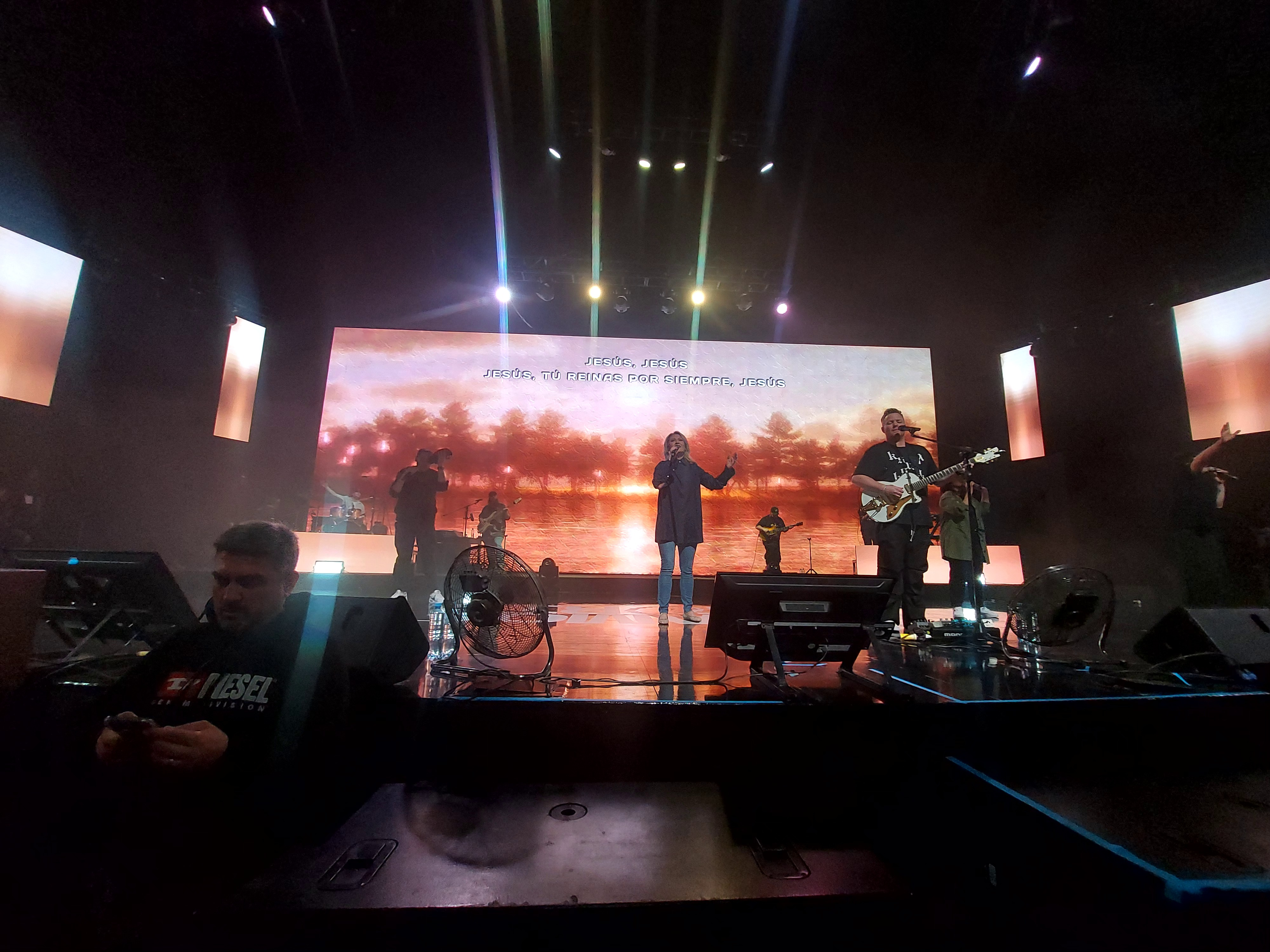
Planetshakers in Lima Peru on October 19, 2024

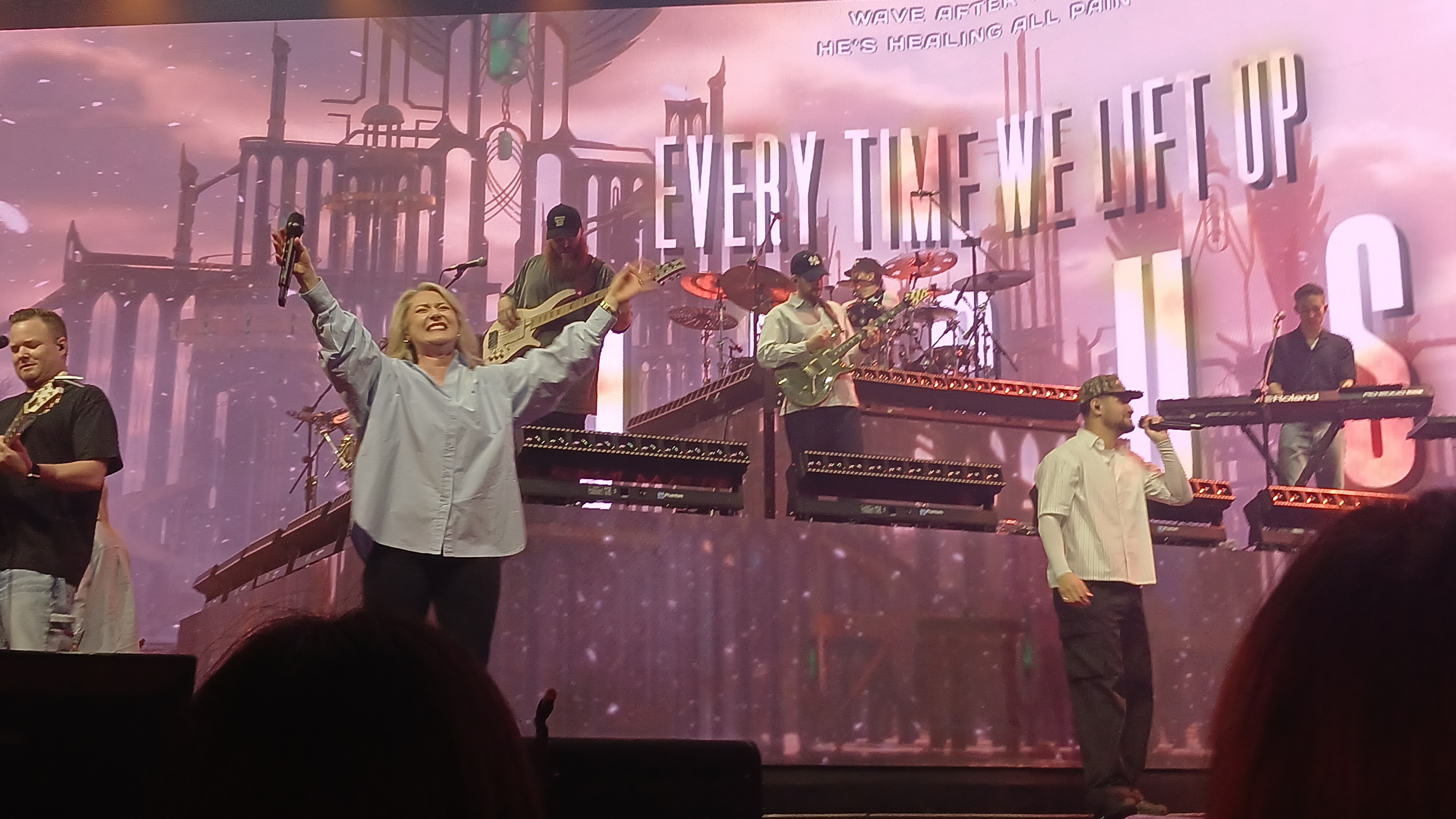
Planetshakers Abundance Tour Manila on July 26, 2025.

Most of the albums were recorded live at the Planetshakers Conference, and released by Planetshakers Ministries International, Integrity and Venture3Media.

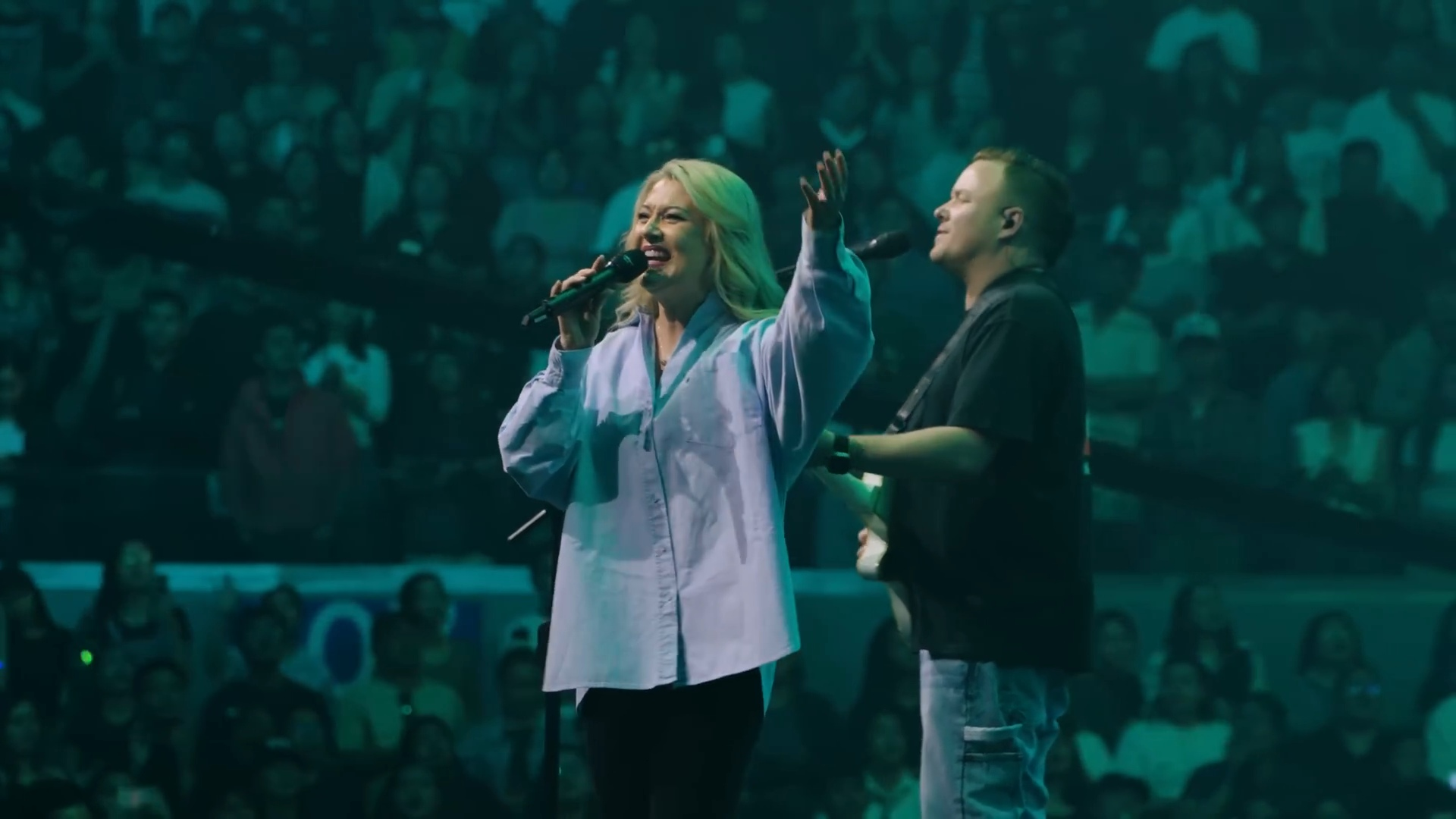
Pastor Samantha Evans, along with Joth Hunt at Day 4 of Abundance Tour IN Planetshakers Music Video AT SM Mall of Asia Arena, on November 13, 2025.

Albums

- When the Planet Rocked (live, January 2000)
- So Amazing (live, January 2001)
- Phenomena (live, January 2001)
- Reflector (live, January 2002)
- Rain Down (studio, December 2003)
- Open Up the Gates (studio, May 2004) (it was released in all of Australia on 2002)
- (My King) Live Praise & Worship (live, August 2004) (it was released in all of Australia on 2003)
- Always and Forever (studio, January 2005)
- Evermore (live, January 2005)
- Decade: Lift Up Your Eyes (live, January 2005)
- Arise (studio, February 2006) (it was released in all of Australia on 1 January 2006)
- Praise Him (live, May 2006)
- Worship Him: 25 of Planetshakers' Greatest Worship Anthems (live, May 2006)
- All That I Want: Live Praise and Worship (live, August 2006)
- Pick It Up (live, May 2006)
- Never Stop (studio, December 2006) and then January 2007 for the official release
- Saviour of the World (live, June 2007)
- Free (live, January 2008)
- Beautiful Saviour Acoustic Series Volume One (live, January 2008)
- All for Love (live, January 2008)
- One (live, June 2009)
- Deeper (Live Worship from Planetshakers City Church) (live, October 2009)
- Even Greater (live, March 2010)
- Nothing Is Impossible (studio, August 2011)
- Heal Our Land (live, April 2012)
- Limitless (live, January 2013)
- Endless Praise: Live (live, March 2014) (also a deluxe edition)
- Nada Es Imposible (studio, June 2014)
- This Is Our Time: Live (live, October 2014) (also a deluxe edition)
- Outback Worship Sessions (studio, May 2015)
- Let's Go (live, September 2015) (also a deluxe edition)
- Overflow: Live (live, September 2016) (also a deluxe edition)
- Sé Quién Eres Tú (studio, November 2016)
- Legacy (live, September 2017) (also a deluxe edition)
- Legado (Spanish version of Legacy) (studio, November 2017)
- Heaven on Earth (live, October 2018) (also a deluxe edition)
- Rain (live, September 2019)
- It's Christmas (studio, November 2019)
- Over It All (studio, November 2020) (also a deluxe edition)
- It's Christmas Live (live, November 2020) (also a deluxe edition)
- Revival (live, September 2021) (also a deluxe edition)
- Revival: Live At Chapel (live, October 2021) (also a deluxe edition)
- Greater (live, September 2022) (also a deluxe edition)
- Greater: Live At Chapel (live, October 2022) (also a deluxe edition)
- Show Me Your Glory (Live) (live, July 2023) (also a deluxe edition)
- Show Me Your Glory: Live At Chapel (live, November 2023) (also a deluxe edition)
- Winning Team: Live (live, July 2024) (also a deluxe edition)
- Winning Team: Songs for Church (live, November 2024) (also a deluxe edition)
- Weight of Heaven (live, July 2025) (also a deluxe edition)
- Open Door (live, January 2026) (also a deluxe edition)
- Mighty God (live, July 2026) (also a deluxe edition)

EPs

- Momentum (Live in Manila) (live & studio, March 2016)
- Legacy, Part 1: Alive Again (live, March 2017)
- Legacy, Part 2: Passion (live, July 2017)
- Christmas Vol. 1 (December 2017)
- Heaven on Earth, Part 1 (April 2018)
- Heaven on Earth, Part 2 (July 2018)
- Heaven on Earth, Part 3 (October 2018)
- Christmas Vol. 2 (November 2018)
- Rain, Part 1 (January 2019)
- Rain, Part 2 (April 2019)
- Rain, Part 3 (August 2019)
- Glory, Part One (January 2020)
- Glory, Part Two (April 2020) (also a deluxe edition)

Singles

- "Nothing Is Impossible" (August 2011)
- "The Anthem " (December 2012)
- "Endless Praise" (March 2014)
- "Covered" (October 2014)
- "I Know Who You Are" (May 2016)
- "Heaven on Earth" (October 2018)
- "Only Way" (March 2019)
- "I Choose You" (live) (April 2019)
- "Fall on Me" (live) (May 2019)
- "Rain Your Glory Down" (live) (July 2019)
- "Escolho a Ti" (featuring Fernanda Brum) (in Portuguese) (October 2019)
- "So Good" (live) (February 2020)
- "All" (live) (March 2020)
- "I Remember (studio version)" (May 2020)
- "All Things New" (Demo) (May 2020)
- "Over It All" (Demo) (May 2020)
- "Chains Are Breaking" (Demo) (June 2020)
- "All I Can Say – Thank You" (Demo) (June 2020)
- "Caught up in Your Presence" (Demo) (June 2020)
- "Champion" (Demo) (July 2020)
- "Great Outpouring" (Demo) (July 2020)
- "So Fresh" (Demo) (September 2020)
- "A Very Merry Christmas" (feat. Mateus Asato & Jesus Molina) (December 2021)
- "I Know You Can (Radio Single)" (July 2022)
- "Greater" (live) (Nov 2022)
- "Come Alive" (live) (Dec 2022)
- "Yes And Amen" (live) (Jan 2023)
- "Nothing Is Impossible" (live in Manila) (Feb 2023)
- "The Rock" (March 2023)
- "Show Me Your Glory" (live) (May 2023)
- "We Raise" (live) (May 2023)
- "Worthy Is The Lamb" (live) (June 2023)
- "Supernatural Love" (live At Chapel) (Oct 2023)
- "We Raise" (live at Chapel) (Oct 2023)
- "Equipo Ganador" (October 2024)
- "En El Trono Estás" (December 2024)
- "Hacedor de Milagros feat. Miel San Marcos (December 2025)

Other singles

- "We Are One (The Live Experience)" – The Potter's House & Planetshakers (June 2017)
- "Your Presence" (featuring Joni Lamb, The Daystar Singers and band, and Planetshakers) (August 2021)

Planetshakers Kids

In 2013, they presented their first children's music production—Planetshakers Kids—as well as their first children's album, Nothing Is Impossible. The album was nominated for a GMA Dove Award for "Best Album of the Year for Children's Music".
