= Lets Go (Planetshakers album) =

Live album by Planetshakers
- Released: September 11, 2015
- Recorded: 2015
- Venue: Hisense Arena, Melbourne, Australia
- Genre: Worship
- Length: 70:19
- Label: Planetshakers Ministries International, Integrity Music
- Producer: Joshua Brown, Russell Evans, Mike Pilmer

Planetshakers chronology
Outback Worship Sessions (2015)	Lets Go (2015)	Momentum (Live in Manila) (2016)

Lets Go (stylized, #LETSGO) is a live album from Planetshakers. Planetshakers Ministries International and Integrity Music released the album on September 11, 2015. They worked with Joshua Brown, Russell Evans, and Mike Pilmer, in the production of this album.

== Critical reception ==
Professional ratings
Review scores
Source	Rating
The Christian Beat	4/5 stars
Cross Rhythms	9/10 squares
Louder Than the Music	4/5 stars
New Release Today	3.5/5 stars
Worship Leader	4.5/5 stars

Rob Birtley, allocating the album a nine out of ten review at Cross Rhythms, writes, "The whole release is a roller-coaster of a worship ride. Perfectly paced at each turn to carry you through the devotion behind the music - enjoy the ride, raise your hands if you like but keep them inside the car." Awarding the album three and a half stars from New Release Today, Mary Nikkel states, "there are moments when it struggles to stay both engaging and coherent in equal measure-- a challenge perhaps intensified by the album's length."

Darryl Bryant, giving the album four and a half stars at Worship Leader, writes, "#Letsgo charges forward from the call to worship". Rating the album four stars by Louder Than the Music, Jono Davies says, "Songs that are powerful, but also intimate, and beautiful to worship to." Madeleine Dittmer, indicating in a four star review for The Christian Beat, describes, "#LETSGO effectively inspires us to proclaim the gospel while simultaneously inviting us to come back to where we belong and actively engage in heartfelt worship of our creator."

== Awards and accolades ==
This album was No. 18, on the Worship Leader's Top 20 Albums of 2015 list.

The video of the song "Let's Go" was nominated for the Dove Award Long Form Video of The Year 2015 at the 47th Annual GMA Dove Awards.

== Track listing ==
No.	Title	Writer(s)	Length
1.	"Intro"		2:44
2.	"#LETSGO"	Samantha Evans, Joth Hunt	4:04
3.	"Nobody like You"	Andy Harrison, Hunt	3:40
4.	"All about You"	Hunt	3:40
5.	"Home"	Israel Houghton, B.J. Pridham	5:00
6.	"Just One Touch"	Hunt, Pridham	6:26
7.	"Stepping In"	Harrison, Hunt, Pridham	5:57
8.	"Glorious Collision"	Hunt	3:44
9.	"Born to Praise"	Evans, Josh Ham, Harrison, Hunt	3:38
10.	"Perfect Love"	Harrison, Hunt	4:04
11.	"New Era"	Ham, Harrison, Hunt, Pridham	3:51
12.	"All Hail"	Evans, Harrison, Hunt	8:32
13.	"Love of My Life"	Harrison, Hunt	5:47
14.	"Jesus Is Lord (Prayer)"		4:22
15.	"I Just Want You"	Hunt	4:50
Total length:			70:32

== Chart performance ==
Chart (2015)	Peak position
Australian Independent Albums (AIR)	1
US Heatseekers Albums (Billboard)	6
US Christian Albums (Billboard)	15
US Christian Album Sales (Billboard)	15
Australian Albums (ARIA)	28
US Independent Albums (Billboard)	31
