= Planetshakers Church =

Pentacostal megachurch based in Melbourne, Australia

Coordinates: 37.8293277°S 144.9553196°E

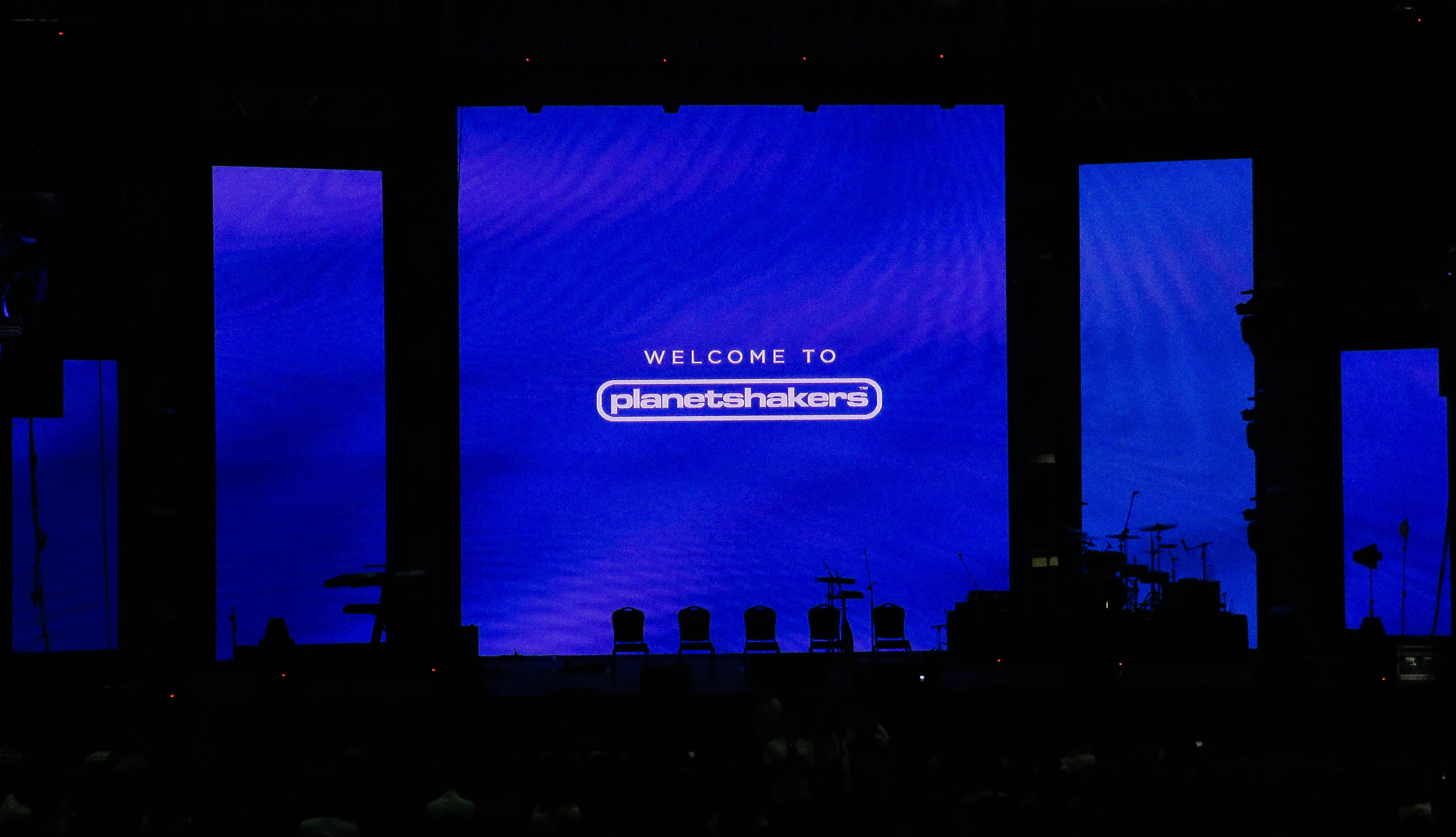
- Planetshakers Church
- Planetshakers Church
- Location: Melbourne, Geelong, Cape Town, Port Moresby and Singapore
- Country: Australia
- Denomination: Australian Christian Churches
- Website: planetshakers.com

History
- Founded: 8 February 2004
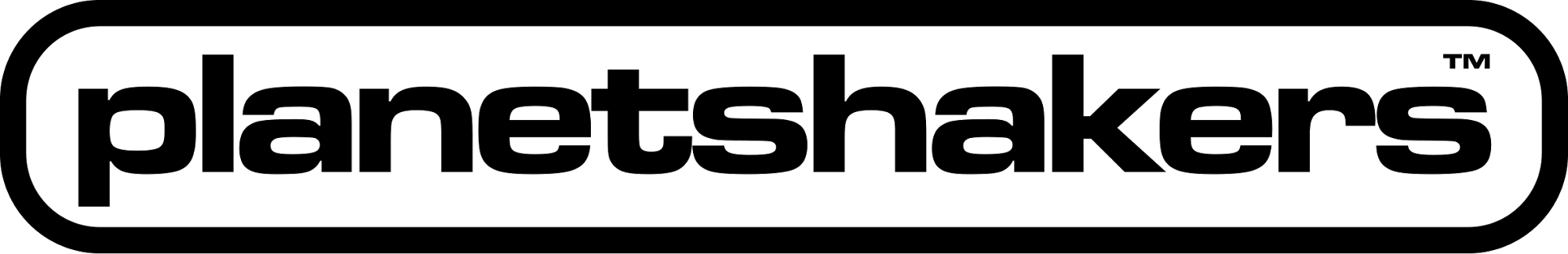

Planetshakers Church
- Theology: Pentecostal
- Members: 21,000
- Places of worship: 9

Planetshakers Church is a Pentecostal megachurch affiliated with Australian Christian Churches (Assemblies of God) based in Melbourne, Australia, with several church campuses around the world.

The church is also known for its contemporary worship music, with its bands Planetshakers and Planetboom, and its record label Planetshakers Ministries International, whose songs have been translated and reinterpreted in many evangelical churches of the world.

== History ==
The church was formed as an Australian Christian Conference and band in 1997 from within Paradise Community Church, now known as Futures Church, in Adelaide, South Australia. The church started when the band and ministry moved to Melbourne in 2004, and was then called Melbourne City Church.

As of May 2022 the main Melbourne church's senior pastors are Russell and Samantha Evans, and they have more than 21,000 members. Russell Evans is the son of longtime pastor Andrew Evans.

== Beliefs ==
It is affiliated with Australian Christian Churches (Assemblies of God), and one of the fastest-growing churches in Australia.

== Ministry branches ==
=== Planetshakers band ===
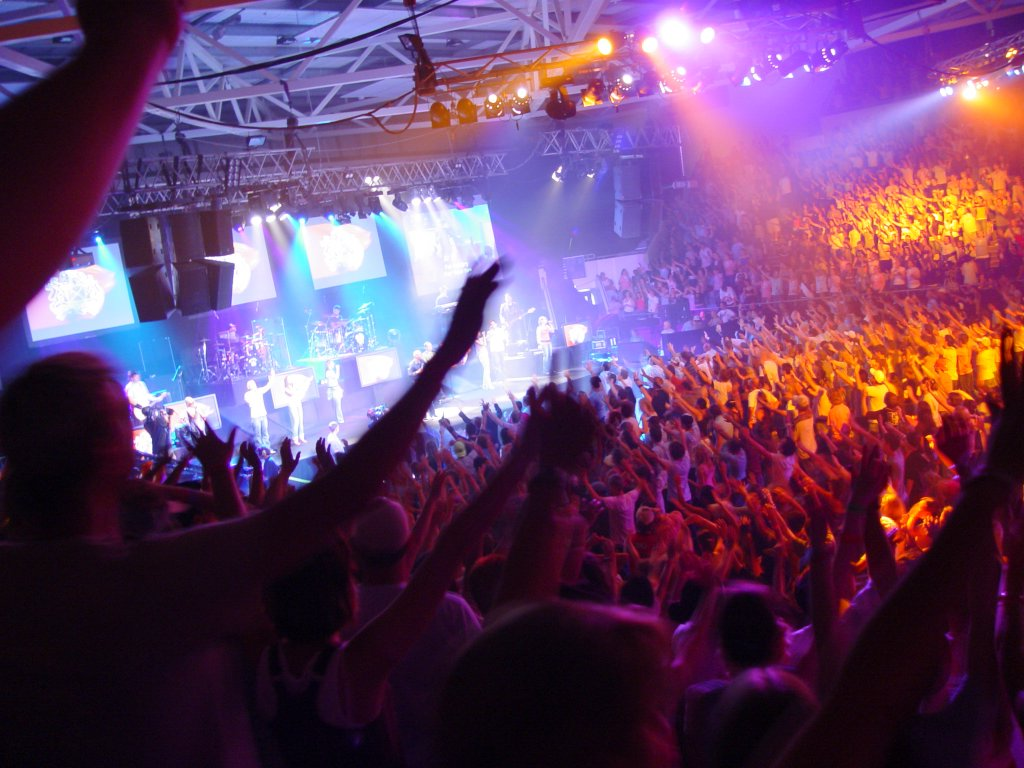
Planetshakers worship

Created as part of the first Planetshakers conference, Planetshakers is a contemporary worship music band with over 30 internationally acclaimed albums.

=== Planetboom ===
Planetboom is the youth ministry branch of Planetshakers Church, primarily targeting high school students, ministering to teenagers via channels like school programs, youth camps and Friday meetups. They created Planetboom band and released first four singles in 2018. In the 2019 they released their first album entitled Jesus Over Everything.

=== Michael Guglielmucci cancer scandal ===
It was reported in 2008 that Michael Guglielmucci, pastor of the church and former bass player in the Planetshakers band, had fraudulently claimed he was dying of cancer. He wrote "Healer", a song of encouragement for believers who were suffering from cancer, for the album Saviour of the World, which was released in June (2007). Guglielmucci performed the song regularly over a two-year period, often with an oxygen tube attached to his nose, and during this time received money from supporters who believed his illness was real.

Guglielmucci later explained his actions as being a result of a long-term pornography addiction. The track had also been added to the Hillsong album This Is Our God (2008), but later removed from the album. Representatives of churches with which Guglielmucci had affiliations told the press they were totally unaware of this situation. In an email sent to Hillsong members, the church's general manager, George Aghajanian, said the news was even a shock to Guglielmucci's own family and that the suspended pastor was seeking professional help. Guglielmucci was stripped of all credentials by the Australian Christian Churches, who promised that all money donated by listeners inspired by the song would be returned or donated to charity and Guglielmucci's bank accounts would be audited to determine the amount of funds raised.

Michael is the son of Danny Guglielmucci, co-founder of Edge Church International, located in the southern Adelaide suburb of Reynella, also a Pentecostal church and a member of the Australian Christian Churches (formerly Assemblies of God in Australia) network.

== See also ==
- Pentecostalism
- Australian Christian Churches
