= El Lugar de Su Presencia =

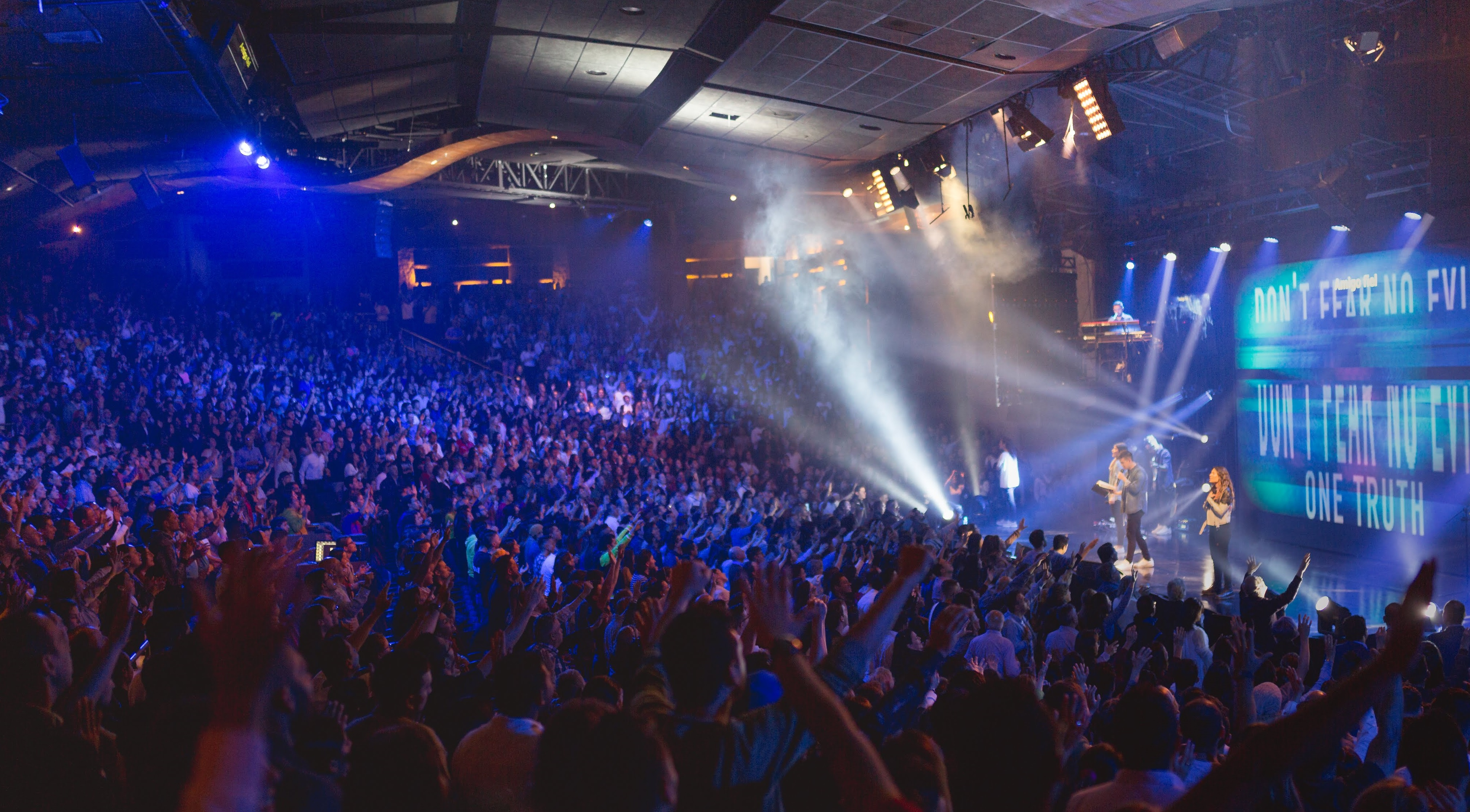
- Worship service, El Lugar de Su Presencia
- Country: Colombia
- Website: supresencia.com

History
- Founded: 1993

El Lugar de Su Presencia (transl. The Place of His Presence) is a Neo-Pentecostal Christian mega church, founded in 1993 in Bogotá, Colombia by husband and wife Andrés and Rocío Corson.

== History ==
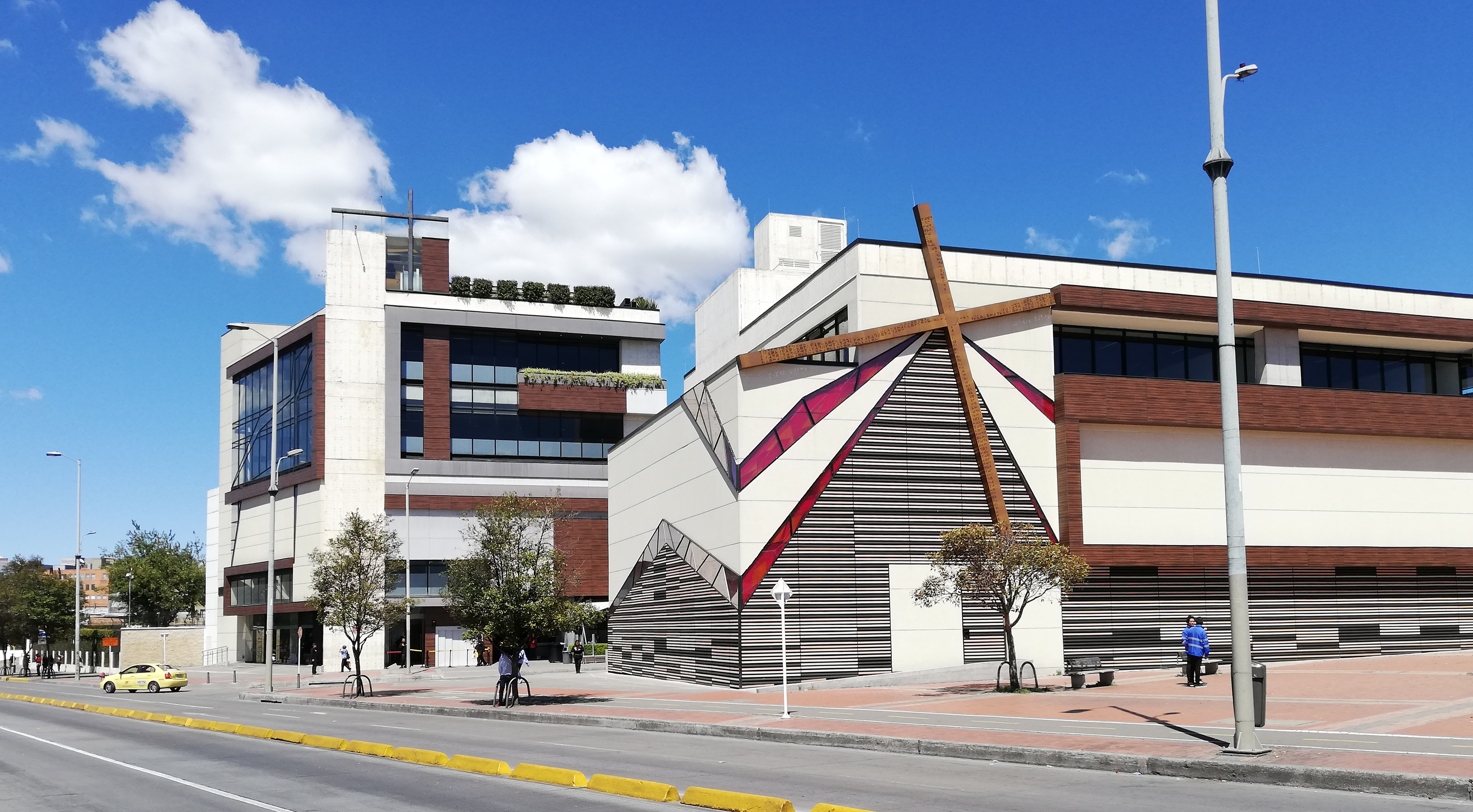
El Lugar de Su Presencia

The church was founded in 1993 by Andrés and Rocio Corson, with the first worship service taking place in a house with the name "Amistad Cristiana". In 2007, the church inaugurated a new temple with a 2,000-seat auditorium. In 2015 the auditorium was enlarged to hold 3,000 seats. In 2017, churches were established in other cities across the country and in the United States. In 2018, the church was attended by 42,000 people.

== Controversies ==
The church has attracted some criticism from the residents of La Castellana neighborhood, who have complained that the large attendances bring problems such as the invasion of public spaces, an upsurge in street sellers, and cars poorly parked in the streets, all of which have resulted in an increase in insecurity, according to the residents. The church has rejected these claims.
