= Russell Evans (pastor) =

Australian Pastor

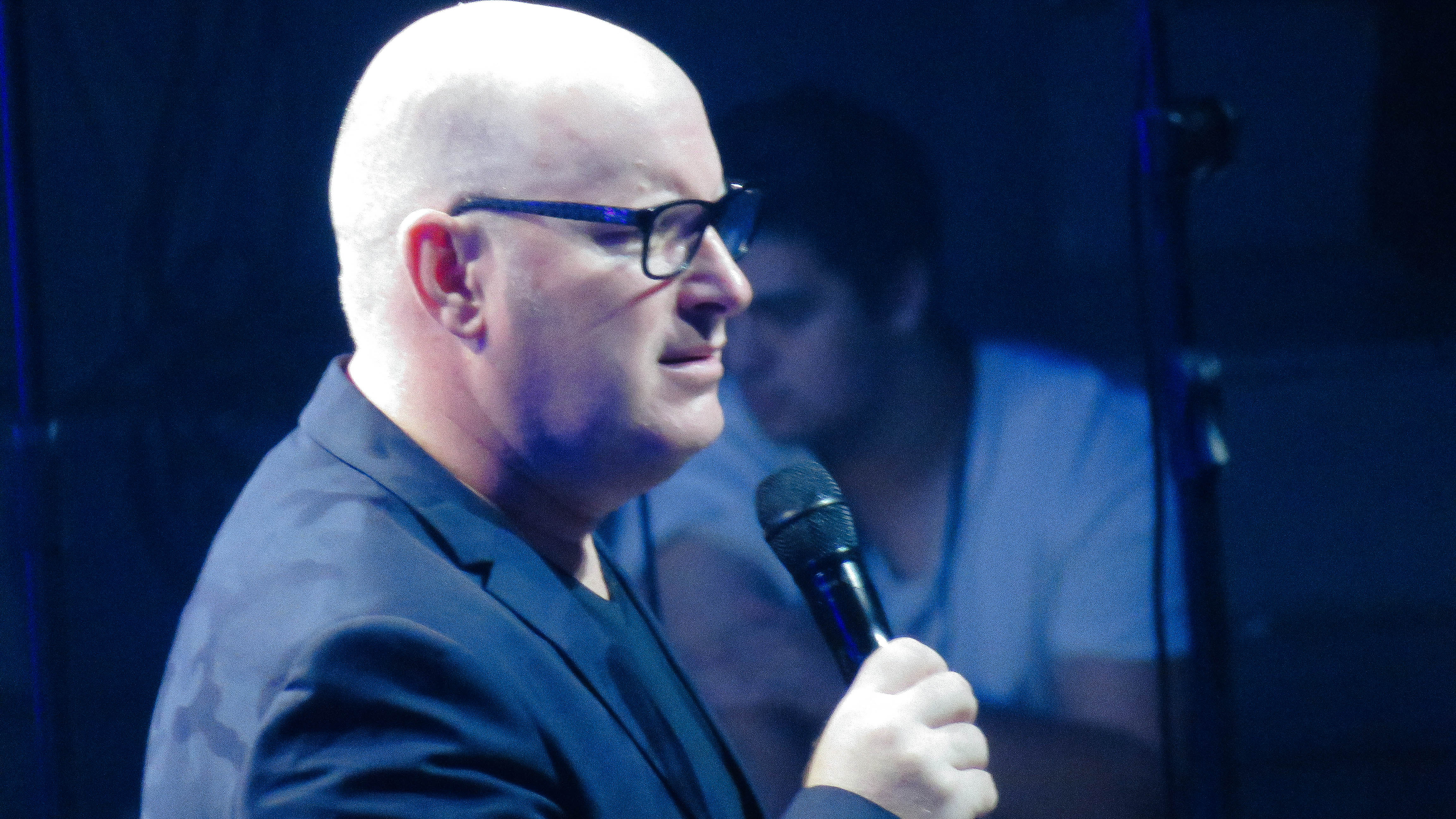
- Russell Evans preaching at the conference Planetshakers Awakening 2017
- Born: 23 September 1967 (age 59)
- Occupations: Gospel preacher, pastor, writer, evangelist
- Spouse: Samantha Evans (m. 1992)
- Children: 2
- Father: Andrew Evans

Russell Evans (born 1967), on the mission field in Papua New Guinea and raised, in Adelaide, Australia. Evans is an Australian pastor, he is the son of Pastor Andrew Evans. Russell is the founder and senior pastor and minister at Planetshakers Church in Melbourne, Victoria, alongside his wife Samantha Evans.

== History ==
Prior to founding Planetshakers Church in Melbourne, Australia, Pastor Russell served under his father's leadership as Youth Pastor at Paradise Church in Adelaide, South Australia. It is now based in Melbourne, Australia. The church started when the band and ministry moved to Melbourne in 2004. Russell and Sam Evans and they have over 21,000 members in the church. Currently, Planetshakers has five campuses in Melbourne; City, North, North East, South East and Geelong, with an additional four international campuses in Switzerland, Singapore, South Africa, and United States.

== Ministry ==
He is an executive producer for Planetshakers Ministries International, which is the music ministry of Planetshakers Church. This music ministry has been very successful over the years with albums by Planetshakers and Planetboom (born out of youth ministry), which is the "expression of worship" for Planetshakers Church and incorporates their entire worship team. Each year Planetshakers records their album at annual live conferences, and the songs on this live recording are sung by church congregations around the world.

== Family and personal life ==
Russell Evans married Sam in 1992 and they have two children.

== Writings ==
Details of books written by Evans:

- The Honor Key: Unlock a Limitless Life (2014)
- Acceleration Part One: Fire (2020)
