= Joth Hunt =

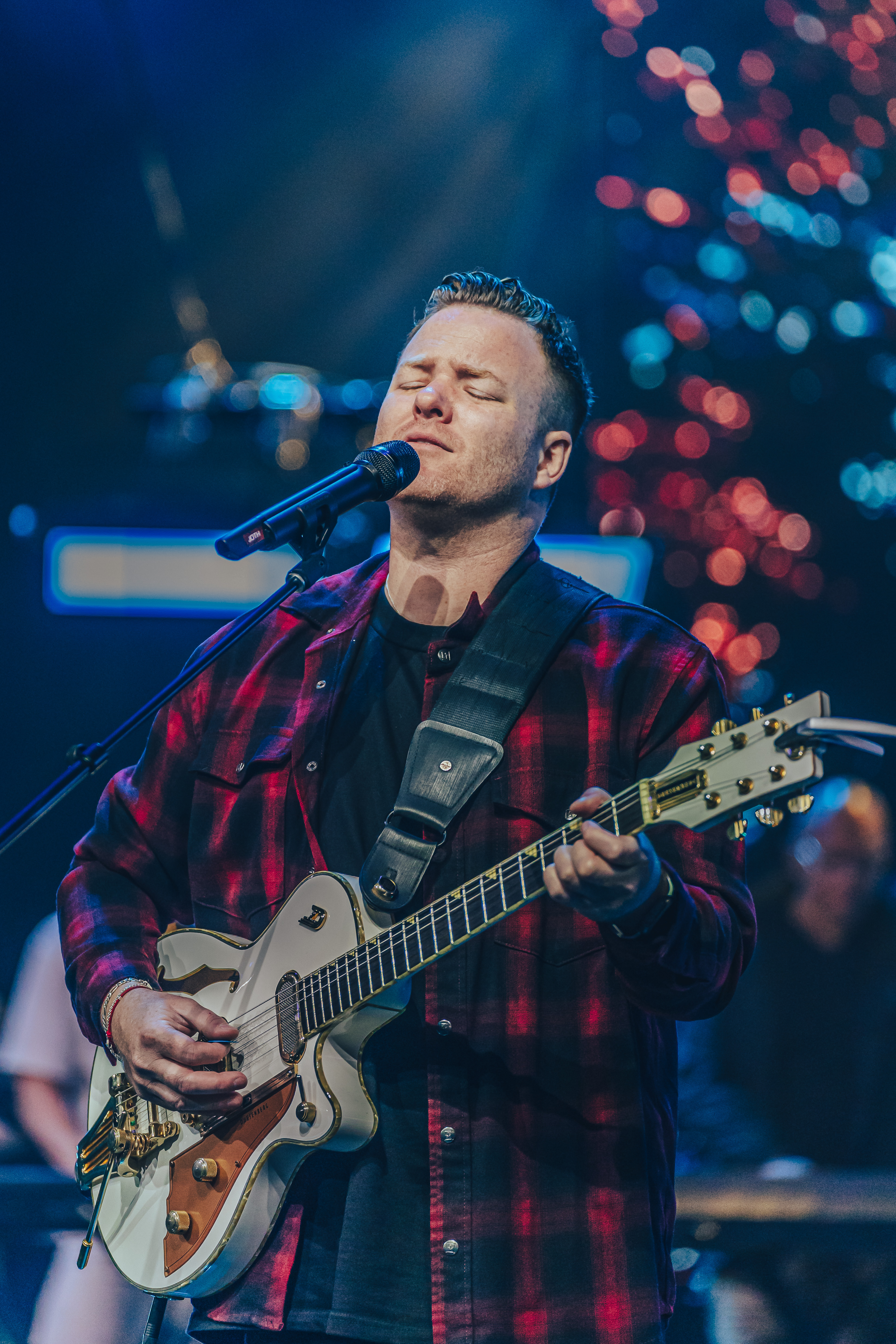
- Joth Hunt Worship Leader of Planetshakers Church

Background information
- Born: Jonathan Hunt; 6 August 1986 (age 39)
- Origin: Melbourne, Australia
- Genres: Contemporary worship music, contemporary Christian music
- Occupations: Worship leader, singer, songwriter, producer, music director
- Instruments: Vocals, guitar, piano
- Years active: 2002–present
- Label: Planetshakers Ministries International

Jonathan Hunt (born 6 August 1986), known professionally as Joth Hunt, is an Australian Pentecostal Christian worship leader, singer-songwriter, producer and music director who primarily writes praise and worship songs. He grew up in the Planetshakers Church, and is a member of the Planetshakers band. His two solo albums are titled To Exist (2002) and Make a Stand (2004).

== Biography ==
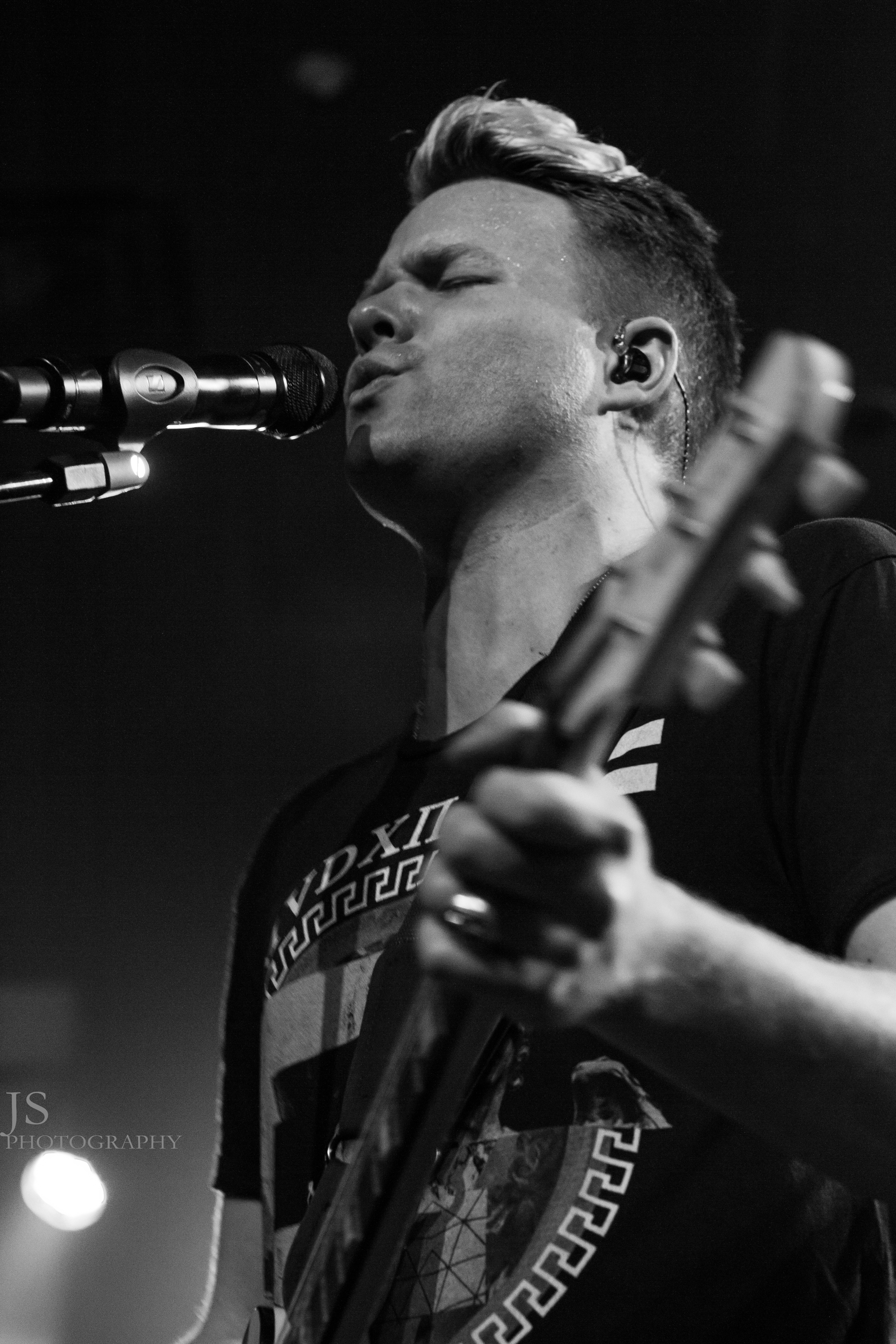
Joth Hunt performance at River of Life Christian Center

Joth Hunt was born in 1986, in Australia. He grew up in a musical family and started playing piano, drums and guitar at the age of 7. He began learning to record music at the age of 14 and began producing music. He is currently producing Planetshakers albums.

== Personal life ==
Hunt married Racheal on 26 April 2010. Together they have two sons named Josiah Eli and Gabriel Blaze Hunt. In January 2019 he was diagnosed with cancer, and due to his illness he wrote the songs "Only Way" and "God Is On The Throne" victory and faith declaration songs about Hunt's situation. After 10 days the doctor performed an operation in which after further analysis the cancer appeared to have been cured.

== Discography ==
- 2002: To Exist (Independent)
- 2004: Make a Stand (Independent)

=== As featured artist ===
- 2012: Rez Power (Live) - Free Chapel (feat. Israel Houghton & Joth Hunt)
- 2013: Right Here Right Now (Single) – Young Chozen feat. Joth Hunt
- 2016: We Are Free (Single) – Nathan Ironside feat. Joth Hunt
- 2017: I Feel So Alive (Single) – René Abraham feat. Joth Hunt

== Award nomination ==
In 2014, Hunt was nominated for Producer of the Year at the Arpa Awards for the Spanish album Nada Es Imposible.
