= Samantha Evans (singer) =

Australian singer and pastor

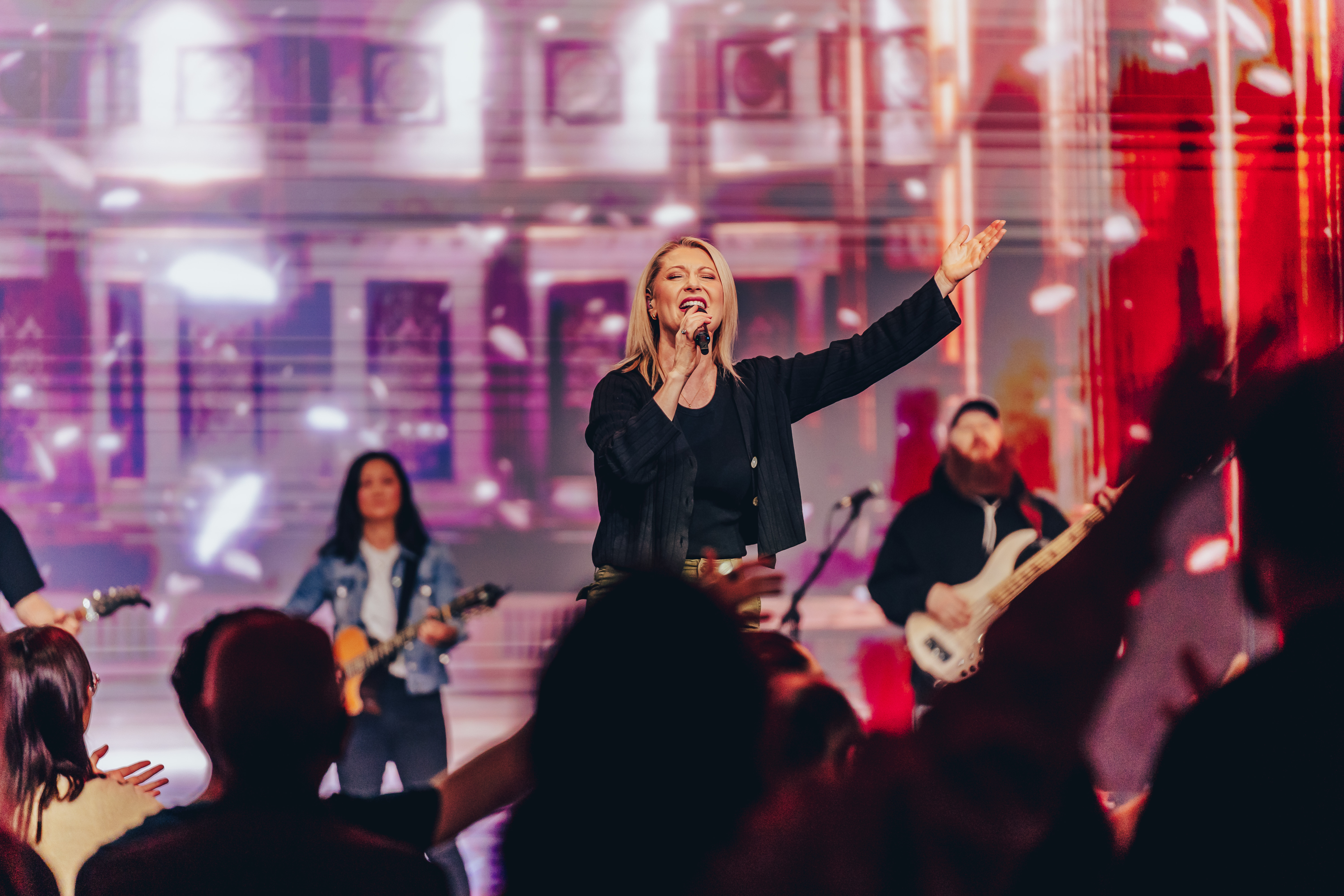
- Sam Evans Worship Leader of Planetshakers Church
- Born: Samantha Evans; April 12, 1967; Adelaide, Australia
- Occupation(s): Worship leader, singer, songwriter, pastor
- Musical career
- Genres: Contemporary worship music, contemporary Christian music
- Instrument: Voice
- Years active: 1997–present
- Labels: Planetshakers Ministries International

Samantha Evans is an Australian Pentecostal Christian worship leader and singer-songwriter who primarily writes praise and worship songs. She is the founder and Senior pastor at Planetshakers Church, alongside her husband Russell Evans.

== History ==
In 1997, Samantha Evans began the journey which is now known as Planetshakers Church with her husband Russell. She has served her local church as co-lead pastor in Melbourne where the first Planetshakers Church was started in 2004 and has grown to more than 12,000 members.

== Ministry ==
Evans is co-founder, worship leader of the Planetshakers band that was formed in 1997. The band, through the church, has a record label, Planetshakers Ministries International.

== Family and personal life ==
Samantha Evans grew up in a Catholic family. At age 16, she suffered family abandonment by her father. After finishing her senior year of high school an aunt began to talk to her about a personal relationship with Jesus and she converted to evangelical Christianity. She began to attend a small Assemblies of God church weekly. She met her husband Russell at the church. Samantha Evans married Russell Evans in 1992 and they have two children.
