= Korean Confucianism =

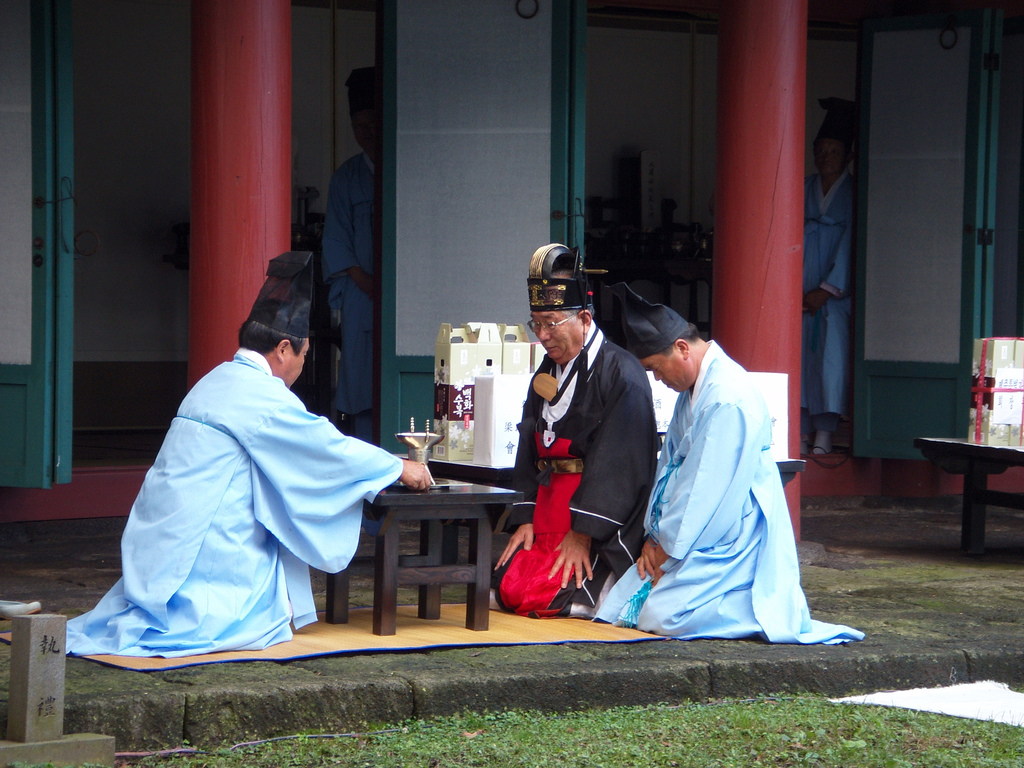
Chugyedaeje, a Confucian ritual ceremony in autumn in Jeju, South Korea

Korean Confucianism, or Korean Ruism, is the form of Confucianism that emerged and developed in Korea. One of the most substantial influences in Korean intellectual history was the introduction of Confucian thought as part of the cultural influence from China.

Today the legacy of Confucianism remains a fundamental part of Korean society, shaping the moral system, the way of life, social relations between old and young, high culture, and is the basis for much of the legal system. Confucianism in Korea is sometimes considered a pragmatic way of holding a nation together without the civil wars and internal dissent that were inherited from the Goryeo dynasty.

== Origins of Confucian thought ==
Confucius (Chinese: 孔夫子 Kǒng Fūzǐ, lit. 'Master Kong') is generally thought to have been born in 551 BC and raised by his mother following the death of his father when Confucius was three years old. The Latinized name "Confucius" by which most Westerners recognize him is derived from "Kǒng Fūzǐ", probably first coined by 16th-century Jesuit missionaries to China. The Analects, or Lunyu (論語 lit. 'Selected Sayings'), a collection of sayings and ideas attributed to the Chinese philosopher and his contemporaries, is believed to have been written by Confucius' followers during the Warring States period (475–221 BC), achieving its final form during the Han dynasty (206 BC – 220 AD). Confucius was born into the class of shi (士), between the aristocracy and the common people. His public life included marriage at the age of 19 that produced a son and a variety of occupations as a farm worker, clerk and book-keeper. In his private life he studied and reflected on righteousness, proper conduct and the nature of government such that by the age of 50 he had established a reputation. This regard, however was insufficient for his success in advocating for a strong central government and the use of diplomacy over warfare as the ideal for international relationships. He is said to have spent his last years teaching an ardent group of followers of the values to be appreciated in a collection of ancient writings loosely identified as the Five Classics. Confucius is thought to have died in 479 BC at 71–72 years of age.

Under the succeeding Han dynasty and Tang dynasty, Confucian ideas gained even more widespread prominence. During the Song dynasty, the scholar Zhu Xi (AD 1130–1200) added ideas from Taoism and Buddhism into Confucianism. In his life Zhu Xi was largely ignored, but not long after his death his ideas became the new orthodox view of what Confucian texts actually meant. Modern historians view Zhu Xi as having created something rather different, and call his way of thinking Neo-Confucianism. Neo-Confucianism held sway in China, Japan, Korea and Vietnam until the 19th century.

== Early developments towards Confucianism in Korea ==
=== Before Goryeo ===
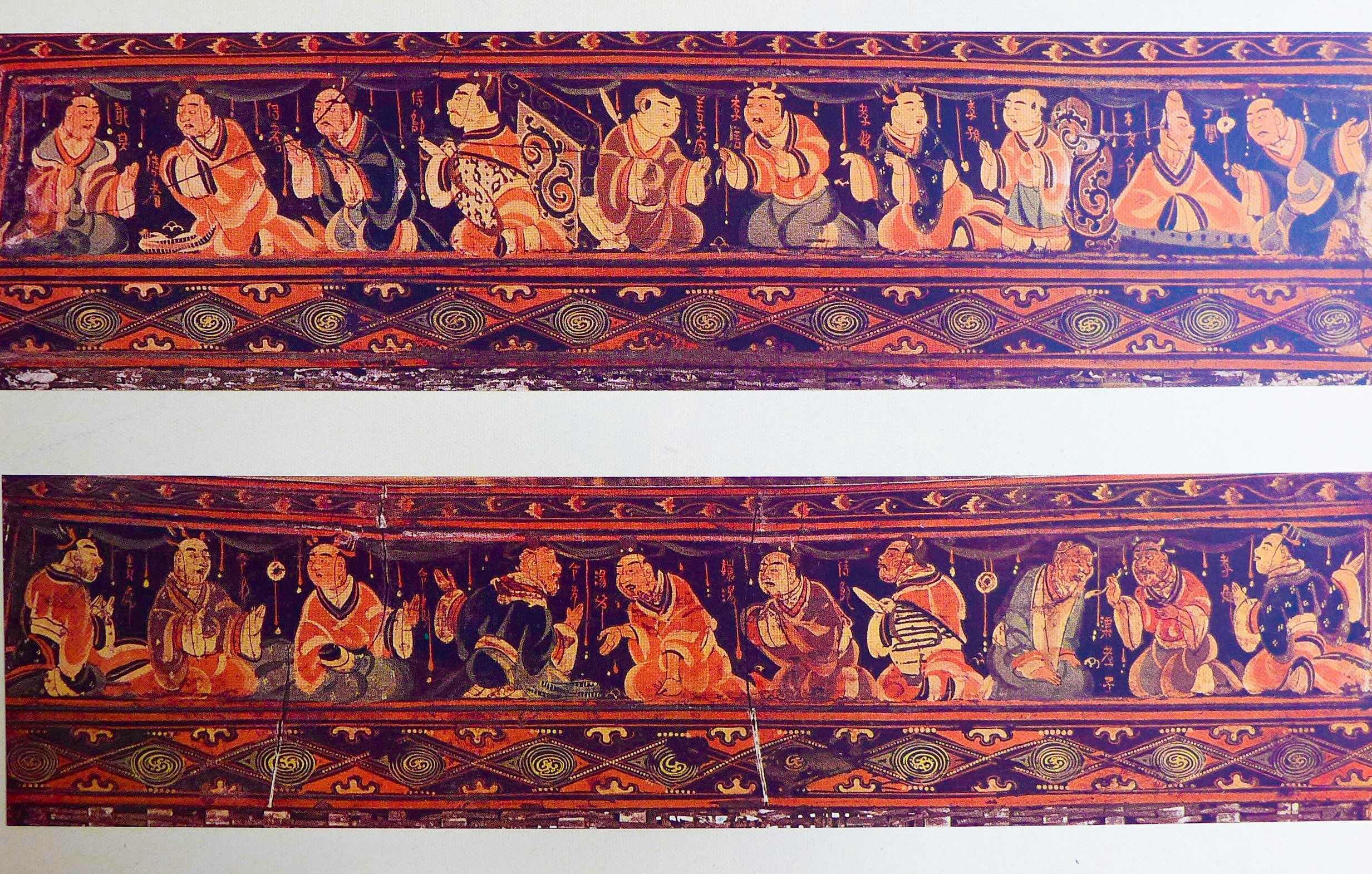
A scene of historic paragons of filial piety conversing with one another, painted on a lacquered basketwork box, excavated from an Eastern-Han tomb of what was the Lelang Commandery in present-day North Korea.

Confucianism can first be traced to the splitting of Korea into separate states, after which the development of the Korean writing system marked the period in which Confucianism began to be studied and endorsed by the higher classes. Additionally, artifacts that depict Confucian ideals, such as the famous "Painted Basket" and a roof tile imprinted with a Confucian institution's symbols, have been found in the Lelang Commandery (located in the modern day city of Pyongyang). These artifacts reflect the influence of Han Chinese and the prevalence of Confucianism among foreigners in Korea, rather than Koreans themselves.

As the Three Kingdoms Period emerged from the Four Commanderies, each Kingdom sought ideologies under which their populations could be consolidated and authority could be validated. From its introduction to the kingdom of Baekje in 338 AD, Korean Buddhism spread rapidly to all of the states of the Three Kingdoms Period. Though Korean Shamanism had been an integral part of Korean culture extending back to earliest time, Buddhism was able to strike a balance between the people and their administration by arbitrating the responsibilities of one to the other.

=== Goryeo period ===
By the time of the Goryeo Dynasty (918–1392) the position, influence, and status of Buddhism far exceeded its role as a mere religious faith. Buddhist temples, originally established as acts of faith had grown into influential landholdings replete with extensive infra-structure, cadre, tenants, slaves and commercial ventures. The state observed a number of Buddhist holidays during the year where the prosperity and security of the nation were inextricably tied to practices and rites that often mixed Buddhist and indigenous Korean beliefs. As in China, Buddhism divided into the more urban faith rooted religious texts and the more contemplative faith of the rural areas. This emphasis on texts and learning produced a "monk examination" wherein the Buddhist clergy could vie with Confucian scholars for positions in the local and national government. During this time, Confucian thought remained in the shadow of its Buddhist rival, vying for the hearts and minds of Korean culture, but with growing antagonism.

With the fall of Goryeo, the position of the landed aristocracy crumbled to be replaced by the growing power of the Korean illiterati who advocated strenuously for land reform. Interest in Chinese literature during the Goryeo Dynasty had encouraged the spread of Neo-Confucianism, in which the older teachings of Confucius had been melded to Taoism and Buddhism. Neo-Confucian adherents could now offer the new Joseon Dynasty (1392–1910) an alternative to the influence of Buddhism. In Goryeo, King Gwangjong (949–975) had created the national civil service examinations, and King Seongjong (1083–1094) was a key advocate for Confucianism by establishing the Gukjagam, the highest educational institution of the Goryeo dynasty. This was enhanced, in 1398, by the Sunggyungwan – an academy with a Neo-Confucian curriculum – and the building of an altar at the palace, where the king would worship his ancestors. Neo-Confucian thought, with its emphasis on Ethics and the government's moral authority provided considerable rationale for land reform and redistribution of wealth. Rather than attack Buddhism outright, Neo-Confucian critics simply continued to criticize the system of Temples and the excesses of the clergy.

== Neo-Confucianism in the Joseon dynasty ==
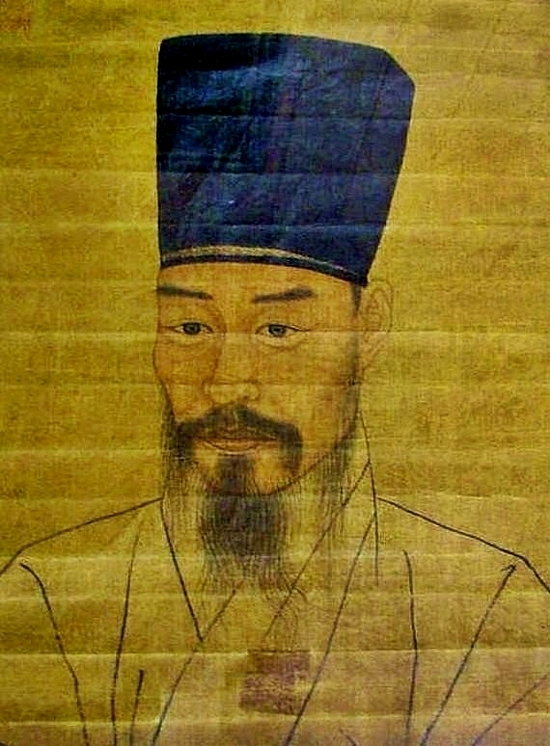
Portrait of Cho Kwangjo

By the time of King Sejong (ruled 1418–1450), all branches of learning were rooted in Confucian thought. Korean Confucian schools were firmly established, most with foreign educated scholars, large libraries, patronage of artisans and artists, and a curriculum of 13 to 15 major Confucian works. Branches of Buddhism in Korea were still tolerated outside of the major political centers. In Ming China (1368–1644), Neo-Confucianism had been adopted as the state ideology. The new Joseon Dynasty (1392–1910) followed suit and also adopted Neo-Confucianism as the primary belief system among scholars and administrators. Cho Kwangjo's efforts to promulgate Neo-Confucianism among the populace had been followed by the rise of Korea's two most prominent Confucian scholars, Yi Hwang (1501–1570) and Yi I (1536–1584), who are often referred to by their pen names T'oegye and Yulgok. Korean Neo-Confucianist organizations typically did not believe in a god or gods, an afterlife, or an eternal soul.

Having supplanted all other models for the Korean nation-state, by the start of the 17th century, Neo-Confucian thought experienced first a split between Westerners and Easterners and again, between Southerners and Northerners. Central to these divisions was the question of succession in the Korean monarchy and the manner in which opposing factions should be dealt.

A growing number of Neo-Confucian scholars had also begun to question particular metaphysical beliefs and practices. A movement known as Silhak (lit. "practical learning") posited that Neo-Confucian thought ought be founded more in reform than in maintaining the status quo. Differences among various Confucian and Neo-Confucian schools of thought grew to conflicts as Western countries sought to force open Korean, Chinese and Japanese societies to Western trade, Western technologies and Western institutions. Of particular concern were the growing number of Catholic and Protestant missionary schools which not only taught a Western pedagogy but also Christian religious beliefs. In 1894, Korean Conservatives, nationalists and Neo-Confucians rebelled at what they viewed as the loss of Korean Society and Culture to alien influences by the abandonment of the Chinese classics and Confucian rites.

The Donghak Rebellion—also called the 1894 Peasant War (Nongmin Jeonjaeng)—expanded on the actions of the small groups of the Donghak (lit. Eastern Learning) movement begun in 1892. Uniting into a single peasant guerrilla army (Donghak Peasant Army) the rebels armed themselves, raided government offices and killed rich landlords, traders and foreigners. The defeat of the Dong Hak rebels drove ardent Neo-Confucians out of the cities and into the rural and isolated areas of the country. However, the rebellion had pulled China into the conflict and in direct contention with Japan (First Sino-Japanese War). With the subsequent defeat of Qing China, Korea was wrested from Chinese influence concerning its administration and development. In 1904, the Japanese defeated Russia (Russo-Japanese War) ending Russian influence in Korea as well. As a result, Japan annexed Korea as a protectorate in 1910, ending the Joseon kingdom and producing a thirty-year occupation (Korea under Japanese rule) which sought to substitute Japanese culture for that of Korea. During this period, a Japanese administration imposed Japanese language, Japanese education, Japanese practices and even Japanese surnames on the Korean population predominantly in the large cities and surrounding suburban areas. Though, in the isolated areas of Korea, and well into Manchuria, Korean nationals continued to wage a guerrilla war against the Japanese and found sympathy for Neo-Confucian goals of reform and economic parity among the growing Communist movement. With the end of the Japanese occupation, Confucian and Neo-Confucian thought continued to experience neglect if not willful repression during the Korean War as well as the repressive dictatorships which followed.

However, secret Confucian practice and organization still took place, and later took form as the Union of Confucian Associations in 1945–shortly after the Japanese influence was gone. The organization was founded with the goal to eradicate and prevent further colonialist influence, and also update the once Myeongnyun Institute into the larger Seong Gyun-gwan College. The update was funded by the offerings given to the hyanggyo shrines, but fundings for the Union of Confucian Associations–later transformed into a new Confucian Association, or Yohoe, the following March–came from either membership dues or income from the land of the hyanggyo. All the collected money was then to be split 30/20/50; 30% was to go to the local chapter, 20% to the provincial chapter, and then 50% to the Association. Unfortunately, after the ravaging of factionalism and struggle swept throughout the country after 1945, many local chapters refused to contribute, which further fueled the battle in maintaining Confucianism with the Association. As it was, there was an estimate of 150,000 members in the Association of South Korea's then population of 26 million. In comparison, Buddhism had over 5,000 monks and roughly 3,500,000 people that actively practiced the religion within South Korea alone.

After the land reform by the Rhee government in 1949, the Association began losing another significant amount of money as the land previously owned by the hyanggyo began to dwindle. The once vast land amounts that the hyanggyo owned in the Yi dynasty were forced to be ceded to the government for farmland distribution, or given up for education establishments. Slowly, the local chapters no longer had as much income to fund the upkeep for the hyanggyo shrines or the activities that occurred throughout the Association.

But the Association was also struggling with the problem their rapidly aging followers posed. With the decline in popularity, according to a questionnaire conducted in 1963, the average Confucian followers per local chapter were in their forties. In contrast, the average age of the local chairmen was 63, and there were very few followers in their thirties or twenties. In conjunction, a misconception was arising in Seoul at the time that only aristocratic yangban families were able to join and follow Confucianism. This was presumably due to the two local chapters–located on remote Korean islands–that had established that only descendents of Confucius were able to join. This was quickly diffused, however, as it contradicts Confucius' own outlook on the hereditary ruling class.

== Contemporary society and Confucianism ==
With the fall of the Joseon Dynasty in 1910, Neo-Confucianism lost much of its influence. In contemporary South Korea, very few people identify themselves as being Confucian when asked for their religious affiliation. The statistical studies done on this subject can be misleading, however. Confucianism is not an organized religion, making it hard to easily define a person as Confucian or not. Though its prominence as the dominant ideology has faded, there are a lot of Confucian ideas and practices that still saturate South Korean culture and daily life.

The traditional Confucian respect for education remains a vital part of South Korean culture. The civil service examinations were the gateway to prestige and power for a follower of Confucianism in the Joseon Dynasty. Today, exams continue to be an important aspect of South Korean life. The content of what is studied has changed over the years. Confucian teachings were replaced by other topics, such as foreign languages, modern history, economics, science, and mathematics. Like Confucianism from the past, a lot of emphasis is placed on the ability to study and memorize. Since exams are so important for gaining admission to better schools and jobs, a typical student's entire life is oriented toward preparing to pass the necessary exams.

Perhaps some of the strongest evidences of continuing Confucian influence can be found in South Korean family life. It is seen not just in South Korea's emphasis on family and group-oriented ways of living, but also in the Confucian rituals that are still commonly performed today, the ancestor memorial services. It is a way of showing respect for deceased parents, grandparents, and ancestors, and is a way of showing Confucian filial piety. In some cases, the memorial services have been changed to fit with religious views. This is an example of how Confucianism has melded with religion in South Korea, rather than competing against it.

In 1980, the "Guideline for Family Rituals" was made law. It declared that ancestral ceremonies can only be held for one's parents and grandparents, simplified the funeral ceremonies, and reduced the allowed mourning period. The law is not strictly enforced, and no one has been charged for violating it.

In more recent years, there has been a move away from the traditional Confucian idea of complete respect for and submission to parental authority. It can be seen in how marriage has become less of a family decision, and more of an individual's choice.

The Confucian emphasis on the importance of the family and the group over the individual has been extended to South Korean business, as well. Employees are expected to regard the workplace as a family, with the head of the company as the patriarch who enjoys exclusive privileges while the workers are expected to work harder. The businesses tend to operate on Confucian ethics, such as the importance of harmonious relations among the employees and loyalty to the company. Importance is placed on attributes such as differences in age, kinship status, sex, and sociopolitical status.

Confucian ethical rhetoric is still used in contemporary South Korea. Other religions will incorporate it into discussions on proper human behavior. It can be found in the government and in the business world being used to encourage people to put the needs of the group above their own individual needs.

Neo-Confucian philosophy going back to the 15th Century had relegated Korean women to little more than extensions of male dominance and producers of requisite progeny. This traditional view of the social role of women is fading away. There is an increasing number of women students holding good positions in universities and the work force, as well as in politics. The arts still maintain major traditions: Korean Pottery, the Korean Tea Ceremony, Korean Gardens, and Korean flower arrangement follow Confucian principles and a Confucian aesthetic. Scholarly calligraphy and poetry also continue, in much fewer numbers, this heritage. In films, school stories of manners and comic situations within educational frames fit well into the satires on Confucianism from earlier writings. Loyalty to school and devotion to teachers is still an important genre in popular comedies.

With Neo-Confucianism taken out of the school curricula and removed from its prominence in the daily life of Koreans, the sense that something essential to Korean history is missing led to a rebirth of Confucianism in South Korea in the late 1990s.

In 2006, roughly 1.2% of the South Korean population were Confucian.

It is difficult to find accurate information regarding Confucianism in North Korean religion or practices. However, the Juche ideology does encourage the Confucian virtues of loyalty, reverence, and obedience.

=== Women's rights ===
Traditionally, women in Korea took on a housewife role due to Confucian gender roles, which limited or completely restricted their ability to work outside the house. But as societies across the globe started to modernize, so did workplace regulations, and by 2001 the women's participation in the workforce was at 49.7 percent compared to only 34.4 percent in the 1960s. In 1987 equal opportunity legislation was introduced and been improved by additional reforms to ameliorate the rights of working women. As Korean feminist organizations gained more influence the government listened, and in 2000 the Department of Gender Equality was established to allow women to participate in policymaking. Although women are still expected to be the primary domestic worker in the family, these workplace reforms have given women in South Korea the freedom to choose a career.

The women who have chosen to work still face major challenges in the workforce. In 1997, major companies in South Korea such as Samsung began to change their hiring practices. Samsung was one of the first companies to remove gender discrimination in recruitment, and by 2012, had hired 56,000 women employees. While there were female Samsung employees before 1997, there was more rampant discrimination in the patriarchally-ran company. Most of the jobs of the women who worked at Samsung were lower-level. When the company did offer higher positions to women, many of the top male executives took advantage of the women and gave them menial chores. However, this all began to change in 1994 when an open personnel reform from Samsung's chairman forced top executives to treat and pay men and women equally. Samsung's newest goal is increasing the percentage of female top executives from 2 percent to 10 percent by 2020.

Despite this steady decline in gender-based workplace discrimination, scholarly research determines discrimination is still present across a span of 20 years (1990-2010) and 52 studies. Additional, more recent, research of patriarchal workplace discrimination also show that women still suffer negative consequences such as increased symptoms of depression. However it is clear that the percentage of women is ever steadily increasing within South Korean workforces.

=== Korean diaspora ===
Korean-American Confucianism similarly emphasizes filial piety, patriarchal authority, and rigid gender roles. Confucian values within the Korean-American community tend to persist inter-generationally, shaping family dynamics, educational expectations, and workplace behaviors among Korean Americans. In particular, Confucian patriarchy has been linked to gendered mental health outcomes; Korean American women report a lack of self-development and self-expression due to lingering Confucian expectations of silence, modesty, and deference. Korean American families also experience intergenerational conflict as youth acculturate to American norms while parents retain Confucian expectations, often resulting in identity tension and reduced familial cohesion. These dynamics are further complicated by the dual pressures of cultural preservation and social adaptation. Korean American parents, especially first-generation immigrants, often view the maintenance of Confucian values as essential to cultural survival, while younger generations may experience these same values as restrictive or incompatible with American ideals of individualism and gender equality. This tension can be particularly pronounced for women, who may face expectations to fulfill traditional familial roles even as they navigate American educational and professional spaces that promote autonomy.

== Korean Confucian art ==
Korean Confucian art and philosophy had great and deep effects on the Korean culture.

Confucianism has also inspired experimental art collective in 1960s–70s Korea, such as The Fourth Group.

== See also ==
- Article 809 of the Korean Civil Code
- Korean culture
- Korean philosophy
- Korean Taoism
- Munmyo
- Religion in Korea
- Seonbi
- Silhak
