= History of flower arrangement =

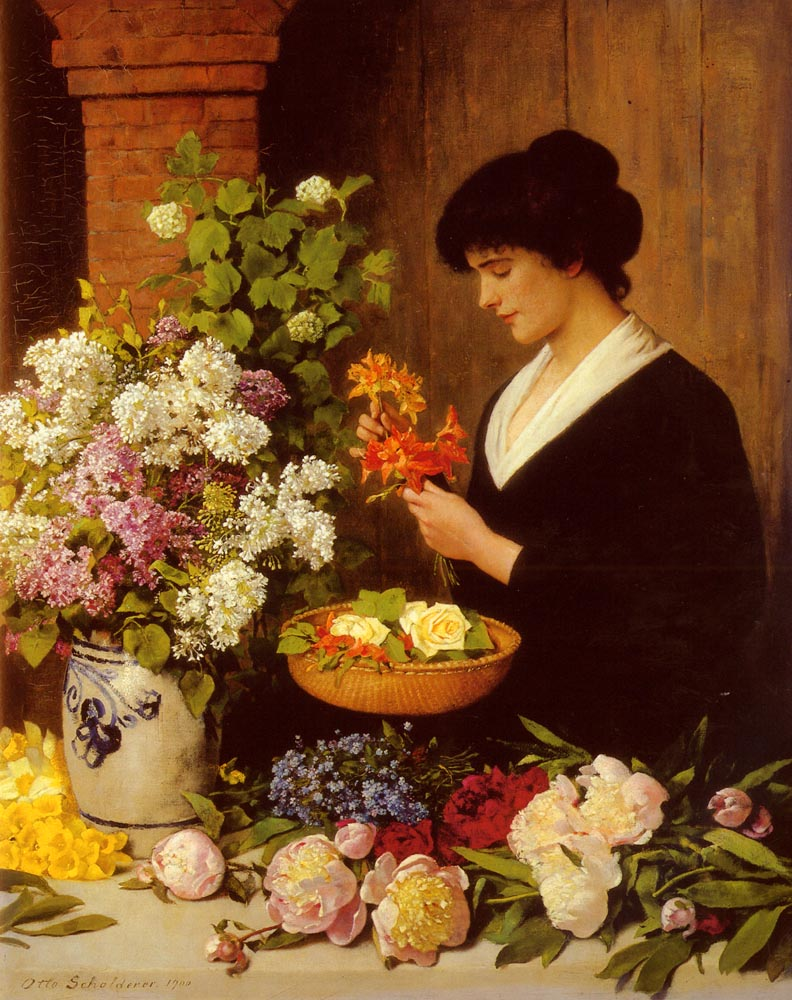
The Flower Arrangement, a painting by Otto Scholderer

The history of flower arrangement dates back to ancient Egyptian times.

== Ancient Egypt ==
The earliest known flower arranging dates back to ancient Egypt. Egyptians were decorating with flowers as early as 2,500 BCE. They regularly placed cut flowers in vases, and highly stylized arrangements were used during burials, for processions, and simply as table decorations. Illustrations of arranged flowers have been found on Egyptian carved stone reliefs and painted wall decorations.

Flowers were selected according to symbolic meaning, with emphasis on religious significance. The lotus flower or water lily, for example, Iris sibirica, delphinium, narcissus, palm tree, papyrus and rose. was considered sacred to Isis and was often included in arrangements. Many other flowers have been found in the tombs of the ancient Egyptians, and garlands of flowers were worn by loved ones and left at the tombs. These are also included in the arrangements blue scilla, poppy-flowered anemone, and Iris sibiric. Egyptian wall paintings have been found in tombs dating from the fifth century BC to Cleopatra's time.

== Ancient Greece and ancient Rome ==
The Greeks and the Romans also used flowers. The ancient Greeks used flowers and herbs for adornment and decorations included in artwork. They did not often use vases, focusing instead on garlands and wreaths. They would place plant material, such as olive branches, in terracotta. The leafy branches were probably used for weddings. They also tossed petals onto floors and beds. Like the Egyptians, the Greeks and Romans had preferences for the flowers and foliage they used.

The most popular foliage used by the Greeks and the Romans were acorns, oak leaves, laurel, ivy, bay and parsley. Laurel wreaths were presented to winners of athletic competitions in the ancient Olympics; these wreaths were also awarded to individuals winning competition in poetic meets, while in Rome they symbolized a military victory and crowned the successful commander in honor of his triumph. The garland wreath was a symbol to the Greeks of power, honor, allegiance, dedication; it was awarded in honor of athletes, poets, civic leaders, soldier, and heroes.

The preferred flowers include roses, hyacinths, honeysuckle, violets, and lilies. Other flowers such as tulips, larkspur, and marigolds were also selected for their shape, color, and form.

Wealth and power led the Romans and Greeks to the greater luxury in the use of flowers which, like the Egyptian, were used in religious rites. At banquets, roses were strewn on the floor to a depth of one foot, and the flowers "rained" from the ceiling. The fragrance of so many roses was almost suffocating. The Romans used the roses at many meals and because of its overwhelming fragrance it was known as the "Hour of Rose".

== Ancient China ==
The Chinese were making flower arrangements as far back as 207 BCE to 220 CE, in the Han era of ancient China. Flowers were an integral component of religious teaching and medicine.

Practitioners of Buddhism, Taoism, and Confucianism placed cut flowers on their altars, a practice which dates back to 618-906 CE. They created paintings, carvings, and embroidered items with depictions of flowers. The paintings can be found on vases, plates, scrolls, and silk, while carvings were done on wood, bronze, jade and ivory.

Buddhist teachings forbade the taking of a life, so religious practitioners worked sparingly when taking cuttings from plants. Flowers and leaves that were used to make basket arrangements were selected based on their symbolic meaning. For example, the bamboo, the peach tree, and the pear tree symbolized longevity. The tiger lily, the pomegranate, and the orchid symbolized fertility. The most honored of all flowers was the peony. Considered the "king of flowers", it symbolized wealth, good fortune, and high status.

== Europe ==
Flower arranging arrived in Europe around 1000 CE, and was particularly popular in churches and monasteries where flowers and plants were used for food as well as for decoration. As crusaders came back from the Middle East, they brought with them new and interesting plants. As a result, European countries began experimenting with plants that were previously unknown to them.

Byzantine Empire (500–1453)

During the period 500 CE to 1453 CE, the Byzantine Empire made its contribution to floral arrangements, which typically included a cone shape design. The foliage was placed in chalices and urns, which were further decorated with brightly colored flowers and fruit. Flowers commonly included in these arrangements were daisies, lilies, cypress, carnations, and pine. Ribbons were also commonly used, and leaves and tiny flowers were set in arching lines to give a twisted effect to garlands.

Latin Middle Ages (AD 476–1400)

During this era, monks were known for having gardens with herbs and wildflowers. In the later part of the Gothic period flowers reached a more dominant role, such as flowers beginning to blossom in altar pictures, manuscripts, and paintings.

An important aspect of the monastery plan was to include a medicinal herb garden, which would "furnish the physician with the pharmaceutical products needed for his cures. A dependence on the power of herbs without reference to their Creator [God] was, however, regarded as improper for a Christian". Because God "causes herbs to grow", their medical utility is fundamentally spiritual. In addition, many plants were used by monks and Christians in general in sacred rituals and ceremonies. They often had associations appealing to spiritual bases as well as to medicinal effects.

Renaissance (1400–1600)

The flower design started in Italy and grew through Europe. Paintings of impressive floral arrangements in vases were popular. In the paintings, fruit blossoms and leaves were woven into garlands to decorate walls and vaulted ceilings, and petals were piled into baskets or strewn on the floors, streets, or allowed to float down from balconies.

The Italian Renaissance helped to give an extra spark to the art of flower arranging in Europe. It was during this time period that a wide variety of arrangement styles began to develop. By the fifteenth and sixteenth centuries, flower arrangements were commonplace and a wide variety of materials were used to make containers, including marble, heavy Venetian glass, and bronze.

Flower arrangements made during this time introduced a whole new element – the usage of tropical fruits. These arrangements also focused on creating colour contrast. Some of the popular flowers included the Lilium Candidum (or Madonna Lily, used as a symbol for fertility and chastity), narcissus, pinks, iris, jasmine, pansies, French marigolds, cornflowers, and rosemary.

Baroque (1600–1775)

At the beginning of this period floral designs were symmetrical and oval-shaped, with asymmetric crescents and S-shapes becoming popular later on.

Flemish arrangements (1600–1750)

The baroque arrangements in the Dutch-Flemish style were more compact and proportioned. Their major characteristic was the variety of flowers within the bouquet.

French arrangements (1600–1814)

During the French Baroque period, a soft, almost fragile appeal became a major characteristic of floral design. Arrangements were asymmetrical using the C-crescent or the S-shape. In the empire period they used simple lines in triangle shapes and strong color contrast. The typical empire design would be arranged in an urn containing an abundance of large richly colored flowers. The most notable Florist during this period was Jean-Baptiste de la Quintinie: Born in 1626, Jean-Baptiste de la Quintinie served as the royal gardener to King Louis XIV at the Palace of Versailles. His role extended beyond conventional gardening. As he was tasked with designing and maintaining the impressive kitchen gardens known as the Potager du Roi.

Georgian arrangements (1714–1760)

The designs in this period were formal and symmetrical and often tightly arranged with a variety of flowers. Oriental design became influential due to active trading. At the end of the period the designs became more informal due to the fact that the fragrance of the flowers, which were believed to rid the air of diseases, became more important. Small, handheld arrangements called nosegays or tussie-mussies were used to carry sweet scents, and also helped mask the odors of society where bathing was often believed to be unhealthy.

Victorian arrangements (1820–1901)

Flowers were considered fashionable in this period. Large mass flowers were placed tightly into containers to create compact arrangements that were asymmetrical and stacked tightly. There was no definite style, but many different flowers and colours made the arrangement look almost unplanned. The tussie-mussie bouquets were still serving to eliminate odors. At the end of this period attempts were made to set up rules for a proper arranging of flowers, which is when it became an artful skill or profession in Europe.

== See also ==
- Floral design
- Floristry
- Ikebana
- Madame Prévost (fl. 1830) French pioneer florist
