= Korean flower arrangement =

Korean traditional art

Korean flower arrangement is an indoor art, and most often uses simple Joseon dynasty whiteware to highlight Korean flowers and tree branches in elegant and unforced natural arrangements. Im Wha-Kong of Ewha Woman's University in Seoul, who also makes her own ceramic wares, is considered one of the greatest living developers of this art, and hosts quarterly displays of flower arrangements. There are at least a dozen schools of traditional flower arrangements, and the art is considered to be in revival.

== Introduction ==
Formal flower arrangements were closely related to the development of the Korean tea ceremony, and suggestions have been made that these were often corner-of-the-room arrangements on small tables using a central vessel with most often a small branch and a small group of local flowers. Sprigs of pear blossoms were particularly well known, and during the winters, ever-green sprigs that would have enhanced celadon ware, or given a cool elegance to whiteware were used.

Leaves, blossoms, ferns, and grasses were also used.

Arrangements were primarily done by women in tea-houses and in the greater houses. Confucian male masters may have done this as well.

== History ==
This floral art was not documented before the 14th century as a distinct art. Votive altar arrangements of flowers for Buddhist temples were precursors. But it was under Confucian hands, in Joseon Yi dynasty times, that arrangements can be said definitely to have begun and were known, and included in illustrations by artists of that time.

== See also ==
- Ikebana
- Flower arrangement
- History of flower arrangement
- Korean culture
- Korean art
- Floristry
