= Floristry =

Production, commerce and trade in flowers

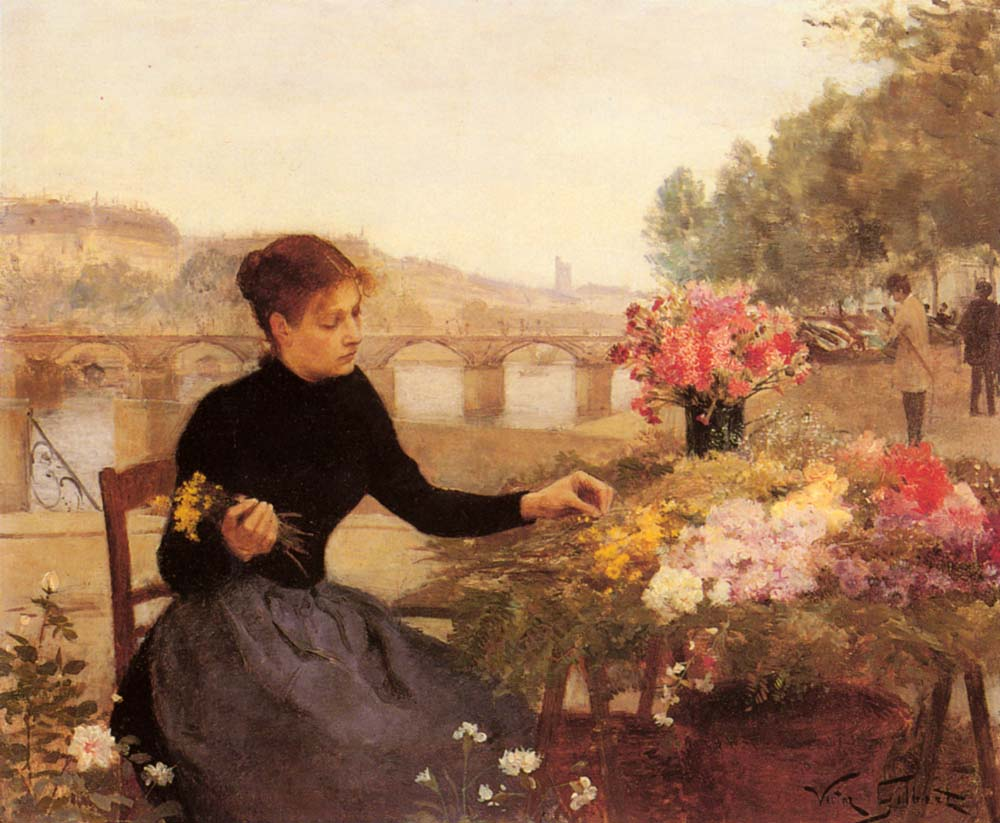
A Parisian Flower Market by Victor Gabriel Gilbert

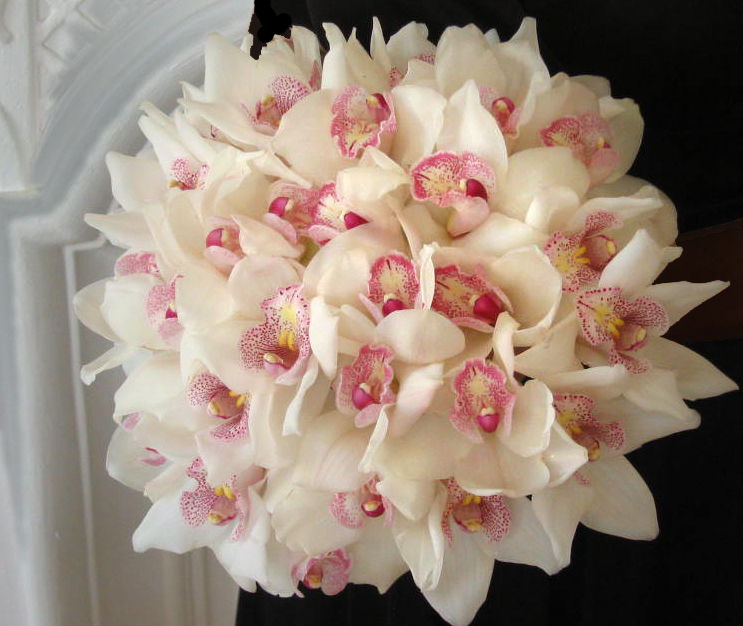
A wedding bouquet of cymbidium arranged by a florist

Floristry is the production, commerce, and trade in flowers. It encompasses flower care and handling, floral design and arrangement, merchandising, production, display and flower delivery. Wholesale florists sell bulk flowers and related supplies to professionals in the trade. Retail florists offer fresh flowers and related products and services to consumers.

Floristry concerns the cultivation of flowers as well as their arrangement and sale. Much of the raw material supplied for the floristry trade comes from the cut flowers industry. Florist shops, along with online stores, are the main flower-only outlets, but supermarkets, garden supply stores, and filling stations also sell flowers.

Floral design or floral arts is the art of creating flower arrangements in vases, bowls, baskets, or other containers, or making bouquets and compositions from cut flowers, foliages, herbs, ornamental grasses, and other plant materials. Often the terms "floral design" and "floristry" are considered synonymous. Florists are people who work with flowers and plants, generally at the retail level. Floristry differs from floristics, the study of distribution and relationships of plant species over geographic areas. Floristry also differs from horticulture, which more broadly relates to the cultivation of flowers and plants so they will remain fresh as long as possible, and would be desirable for purchase, which also involves knowledge of customers' requirements and expectations. The ability to create a variety of floral designs such as wreaths, bouquets, corsages, boutonnières, permanent arrangements, and other more complicated arrangements is also important.

The floristry business has a significant market in the corporate and social event world, as flowers play a large part in the decor of special events and meetings. Centerpieces, entryways, reception tables, bridal bouquets, wedding chuppahs, and stage sets are only a few examples of how flowers are used in the business and social event settings. Flowers are also traditionally used in ecclesiastical settings and their arrangement is often done by skilled church volunteers.

== Styles ==
Many nations have their own style of floral arranging. This is dependent on what flower varieties are readily available, and the culture of the nation.

=== Ikebana ===
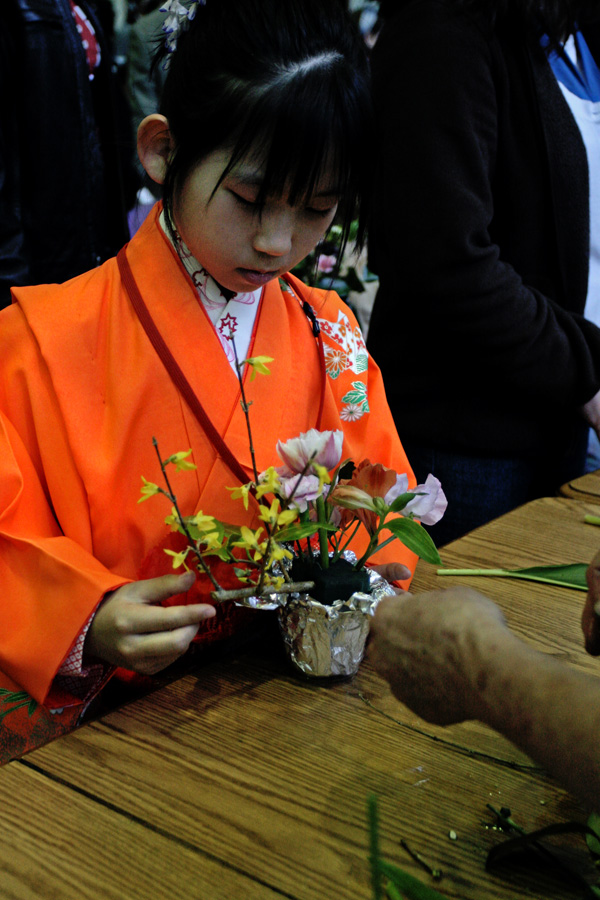
Child learning the art of Ikebana

Ikebana is a style of floral design that originated in Japan. Best known for its simplicity of line and form, ikebana is a design style primarily practiced for personal enjoyment. It has three parts of alignment: heaven, man, and earth.

=== English Garden ===
English Garden style is traditionally an English form of floral design. Stems are placed in a radial fashion and feature abundant use of seasonal flowers and foliages. These designs are often done as low, tufted mounds, or taller vase arrangements that are all-sided (360°), and incorporate garden flowers like roses, gardenia, camellia, delphinium and peonies. The flowers are usually arranged with minimal space between the blooms and foliage is used to accent the flowers as these are the main feature.

=== Modern/European Style ===
Modern/European Style floristry involves contemporary, linear designs that highlight unique forms of both individual floral materials and of the designs themselves. Arrangements generally feature negative space and incorporate asymmetric placement of materials. The style stands in direct contrast to traditional radial arrangements such as English Garden. Modern designs are identified by their play on the space used between each bloom, which is often dramatic, and the play on the use of color and different textures, which can be quite experimental.

Modern/European Style designs often incorporate unique, exotic or tropical flowers such as bird of paradise, orchids, Anthurium, and Protea of the Caribbean and other exotic locals, but may also employ more common blossoms, such as Roses, Gerberas and lilies.

=== Contemporary/Dutch Style ===
Contemporary/Dutch Style designs also involve contemporary and linear designs. The Dutch designs use a lot of different kinds of greens are used in a natural way. The "Dutch Garden" style arrangement—started in the early 1980s—is a very good example of a Dutch style arrangement. Stones, bark and mosses are used in these designs.

== Significance of particular flowers ==
Typically, a florist will organize flowers by season and holiday. Flowers have various different meanings in different cultures. The holidays and events for which flowers are used vary. Poppies are used to remember fallen soldiers only in Great Britain and the Commonwealth countries. People often prefer flowers that are associated with their ethnic group or country and the cultural meaning of the flower color strongly affects their choice and use. Colors convey different meanings to different groups so that, for example, various colors may be associated with luck or death or love. A flower such as a red rose might communicate love in some cultures, whereas in others, it might be considered indecent or simply puzzling. The vastly divergent attitudes to the color white can also lead to miscommunication and sometimes give offense. White, for example, represents death in many Asian cultures, whereas white is usually a symbol of purity and innocence in countries with a European heritage. Early Victorians, among others, developed an entire, comprehensive language of flowers sometimes referenced in the floral industry today.

== Role in personal relationships ==
Due to the meaning and significance of different flowers and the many design possibilities using floral materials, they play many roles in personal relationships. Flowers are sent to express love, celebrate special occasions, offer condolences, and more

During the COVID-19 pandemic of 2020-2021, floristry became an even more important means of communicating with loved ones from a distance. As The New York Times noted, "in lieu of saying it in person, we're all saying it with flowers." This has led to an increase in profit for the American floral industry; over 80% of respondents to a 2021 survey conducted by the Society of American Florists said their 2020 holiday sales had increased compared with 2019.

== Fresh flower sources ==
Retail florists are primarily supplied with fresh flowers by local growers, local wholesalers, and flower auctions. The majority of these are provided by specialist horticultural and cut flower suppliers.

Internationally, there are hundreds of wholesale flower markets and auctions, the largest of which is Bloemenveiling Aalsmeer, located in Aalsmeer, the Netherlands. Other major markets include the fledgling Dubai Flower Centre and the Ota Flower Market in Tokyo, Japan.

Within North America, Miami is considered to be the main distribution point for imported fresh flowers. Wholesalers there distribute locally, regionally, and nationally, with principle North American hubs including New York, Boston, Los Angeles, San Francisco, and Carlsbad, California. Flower auctions are run using the Dutch clock system, and are mainly located in Toronto, Montreal, and Vancouver Canada.

== Floral supplies ==
Floral foam is a foam used by florists to fixate flower stems for storage and delivery. It usually consists of phenol-formaldehyde plastic. Due to an additional treatment with detergents, the substance can soak up water and increase the longevity of arranged flowers. Floral foam is non-biodegradable, non-recyclable and toxic for both humans and animals.

== Floristry shops ==
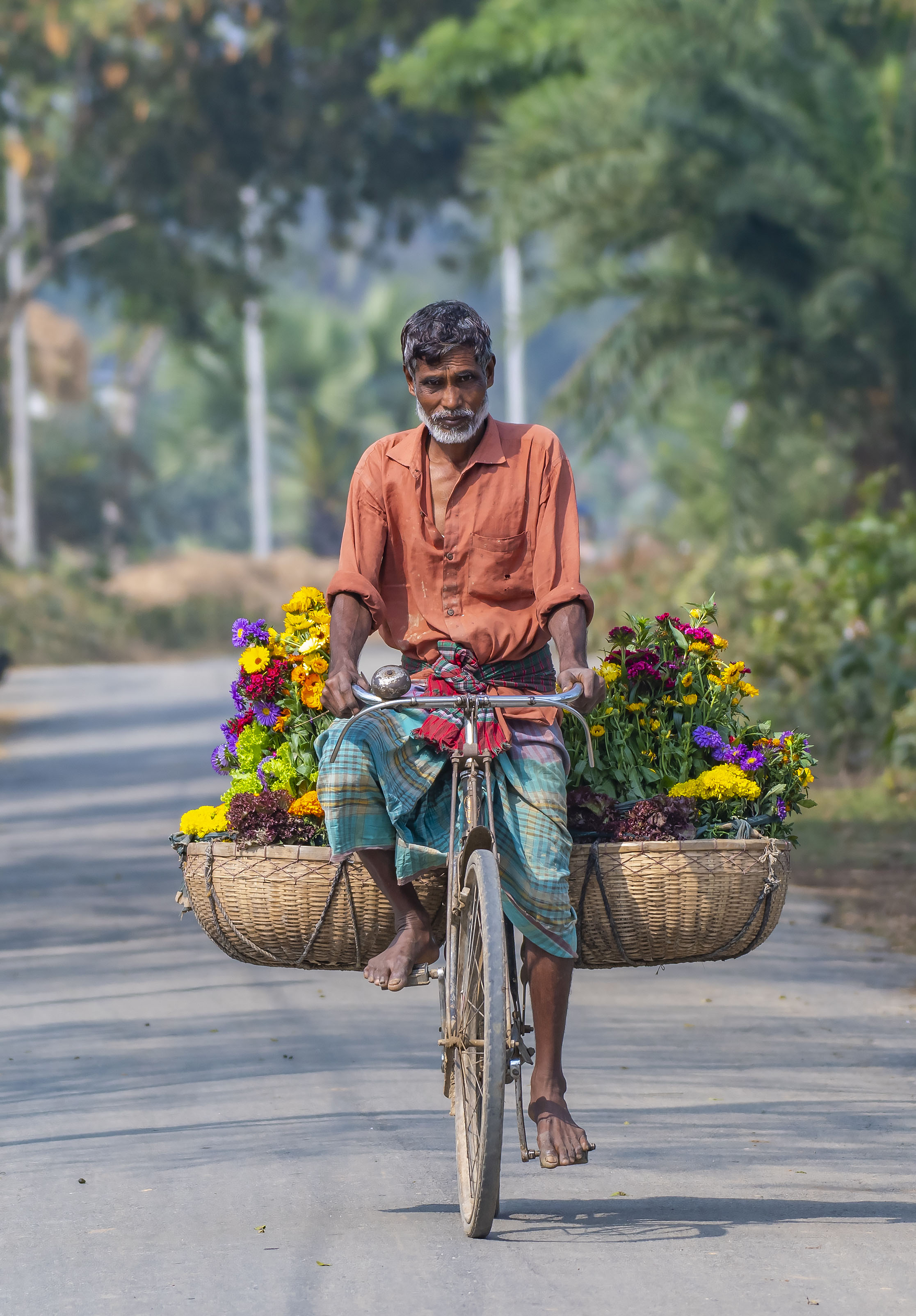
Flowers have traditionally been sold by street vendors. The practice continues in many cities today.

Historically the flower trade in Paris had been managed by the Maîtresses bouquetières (1677-1791), a guild of flower sellers, who had sold their flowers as street vendors. The guild was abolished during the French Revolution, but flowers were only sold by street vendors until the flower sellers were allowed to open flower shops in 1828–29, and in 1830 the pioneer Madame Prévost opened her own flower shop at the Palais-Royal in Paris.

In the Netherlands gardeners started to sell flower arrangements from around 1850. In 1851 Butz Flowers opened its doors in New Castle, Pennsylvania, and is still operating today as one of the oldest floristry shops in the United States. Soon after, around 1900, the first flower shops started to open in The Netherlands. At that time the flower shops also had small greenhouses from which they sold their flowers.

Generally, a florist's shop will contain a large array of flowers, sometimes displayed on the street, or will have a large plate glass window to display the flowers. To keep them fresh, the flowers will be refrigerated and kept in water, generally in glass or plastic vases or other containers. Most shops have a refrigerator/chiller cabinet/cooler near the front of the shop/store with large glass doors so that customers can easily view the contents. Some shops also have another cooler out of the customers' view where they keep extra stock and arrangements for customers' orders. Most stores have a separate work room in which the design florist or designers can work on orders with more privacy.

The flowers sold in florist shops typically represent the varieties abundantly available in the season but also include blossoms flown in from around the world. Basic varieties in temperate latitudes include roses, tulips, irises, orchids and lilies. Fashion sometimes plays a role in floristry; what is considered the flower that everyone needs to have today can change very quickly.

Some shops also stock gift baskets, fruits, and chocolates as well as flowers, whereas some shops will purchase these things only when needed for an order. Floral business is seasonal and is heavily influenced by the following holidays and events: Christmas, Valentine's Day, Administrative Professionals' Day, Mothers' Day, All Souls Day, Advent, Easter, weddings and funerals. These occasions make up the largest part of the business, with the sale of house plants and home decor being a smaller, but more constant, part. Flowers for personal enjoyment as well as those selected to celebrate birthdays, anniversaries, thank-yous and get well wishes are also a significant portion of a florist's business.

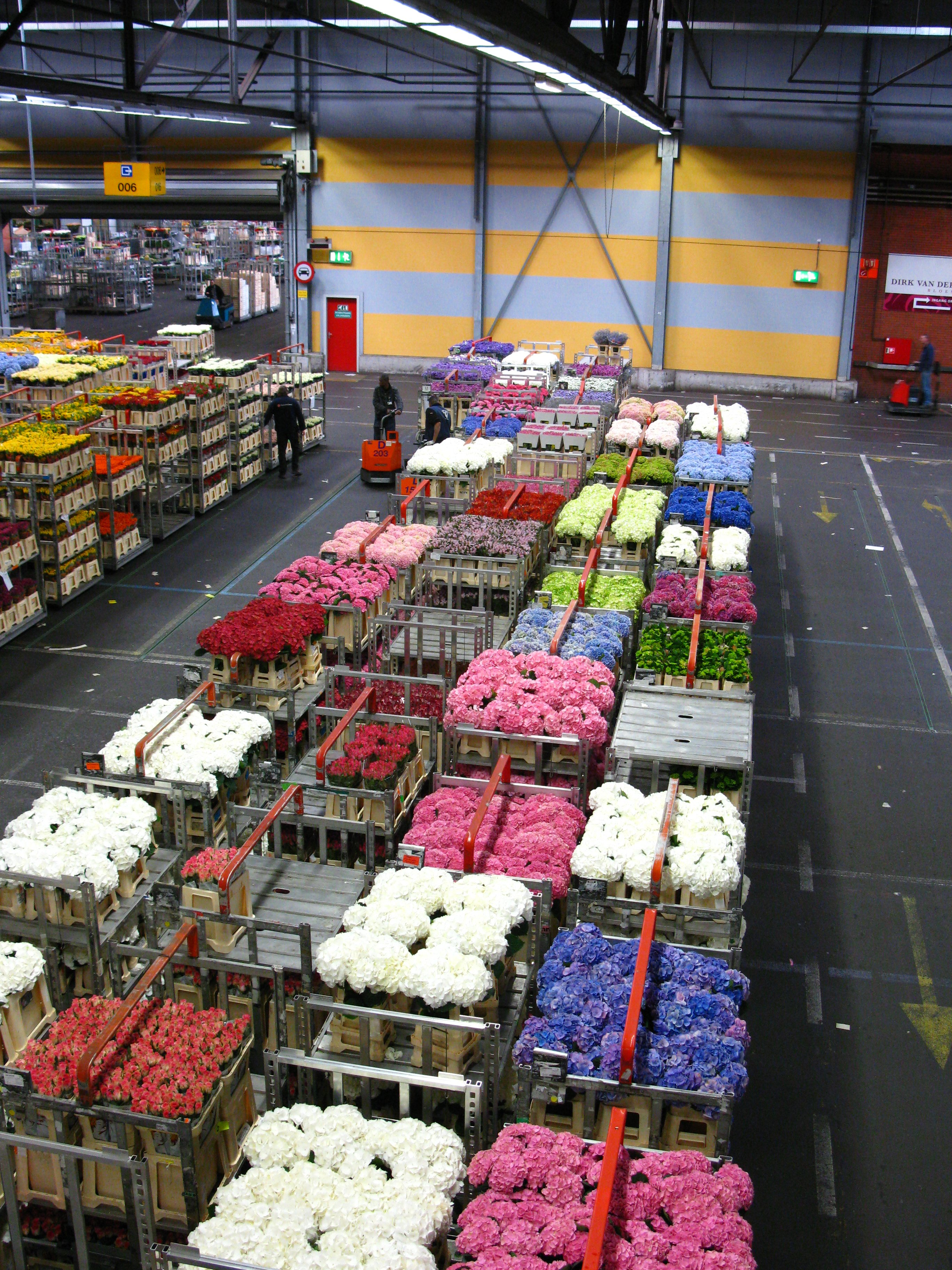
Flower market in Aalsmeer

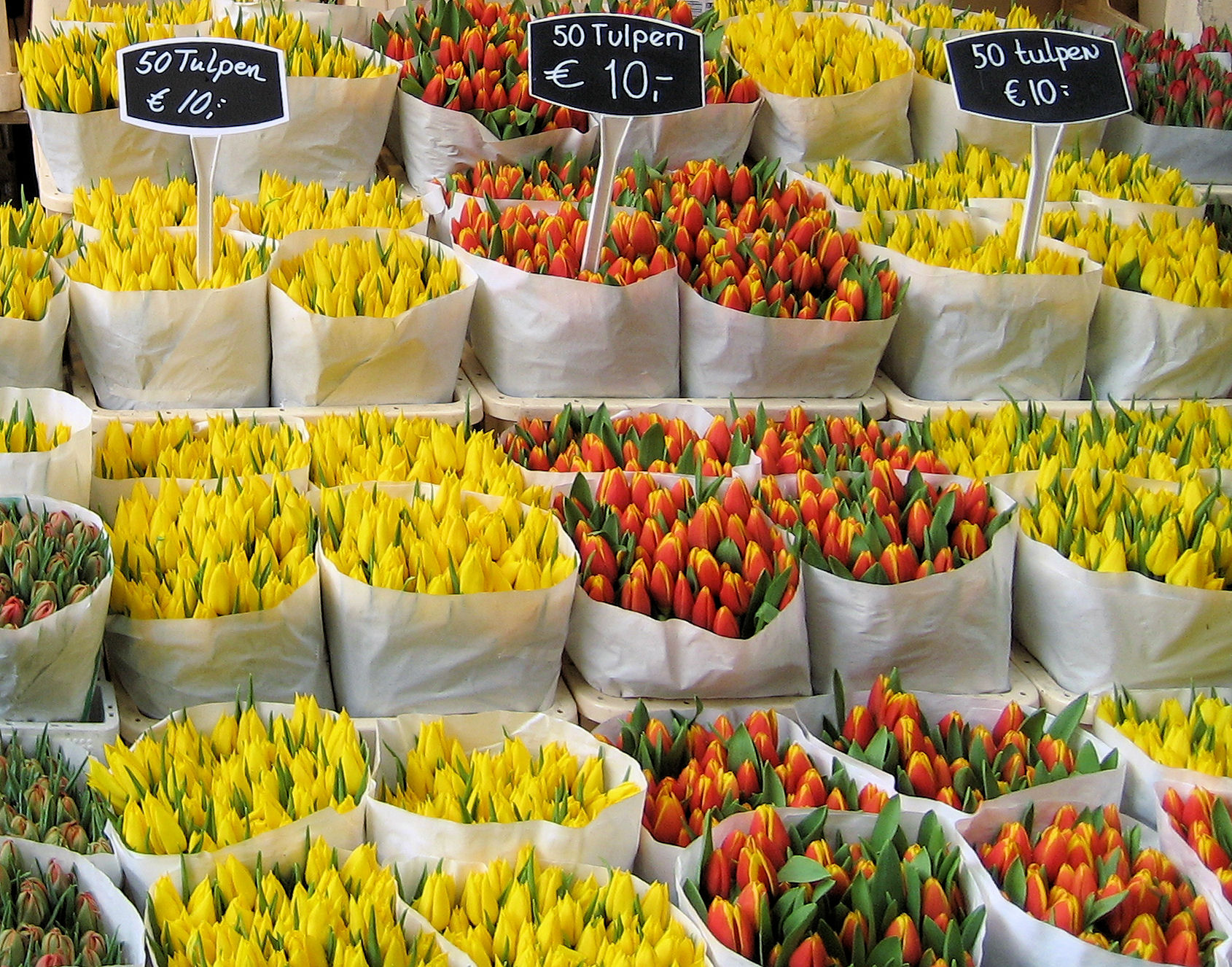
Tulip shop in Amsterdam

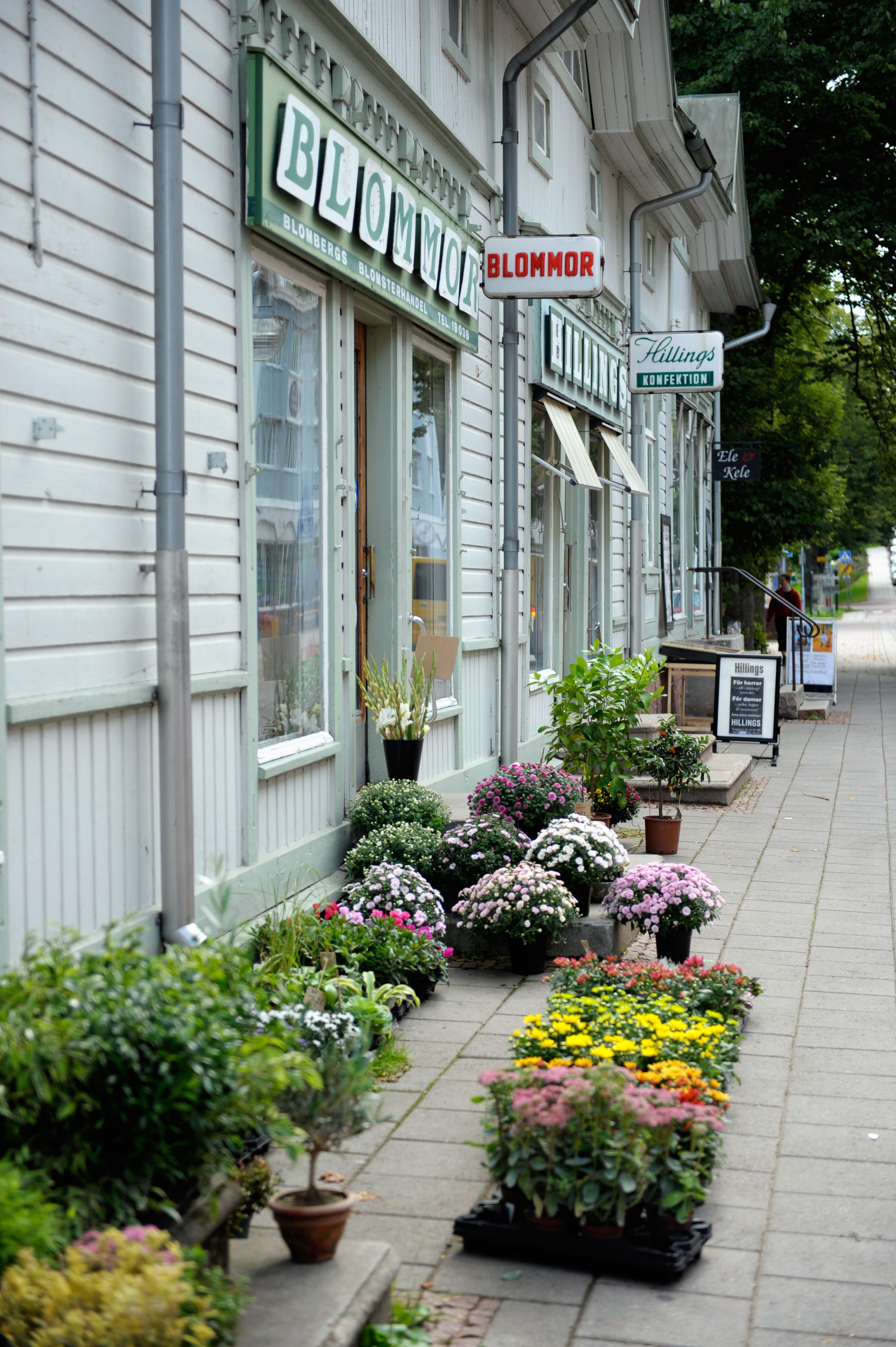
Flower market in Mariehamn

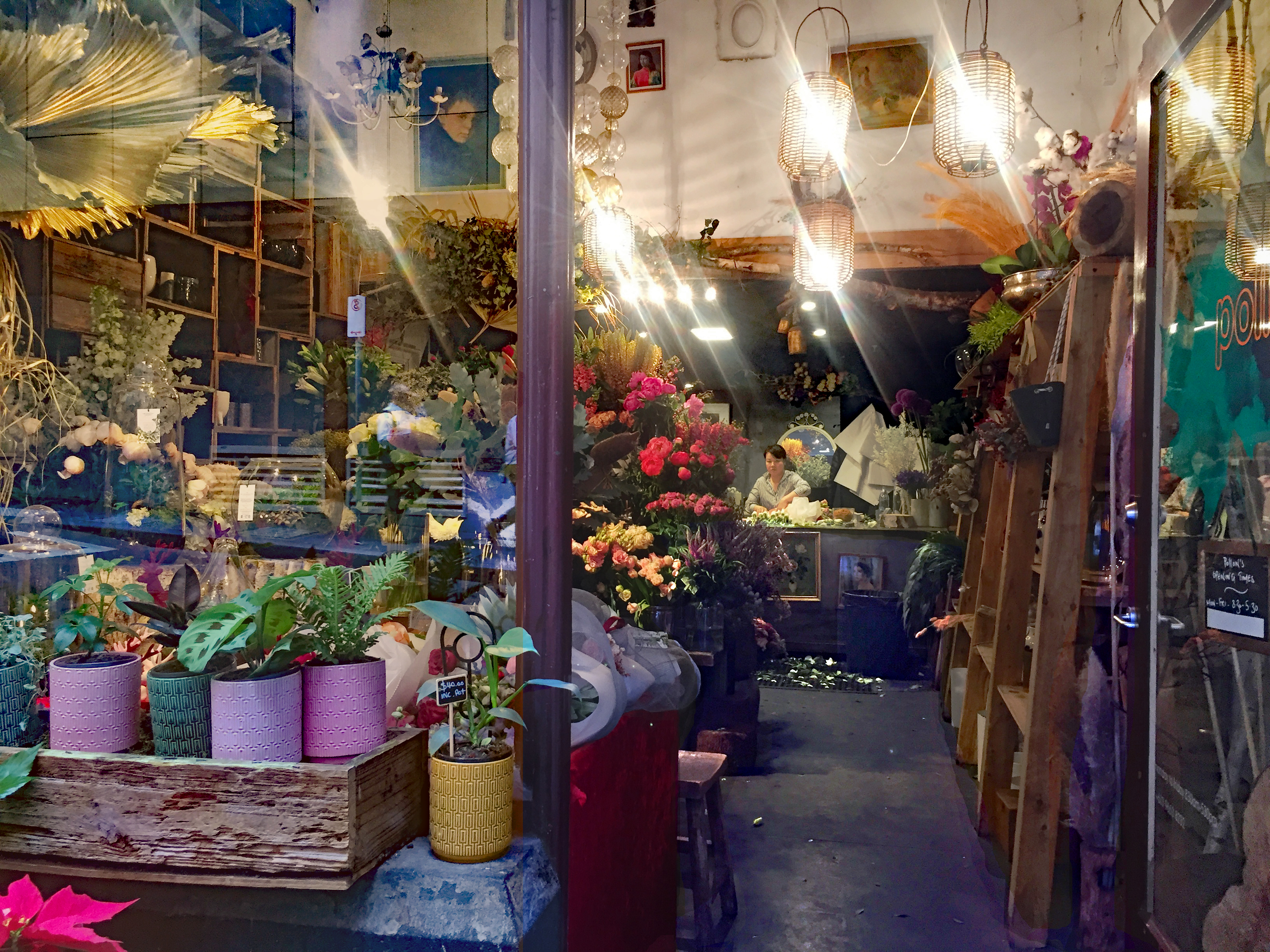
Florist shop in Flinders Lane, Melbourne

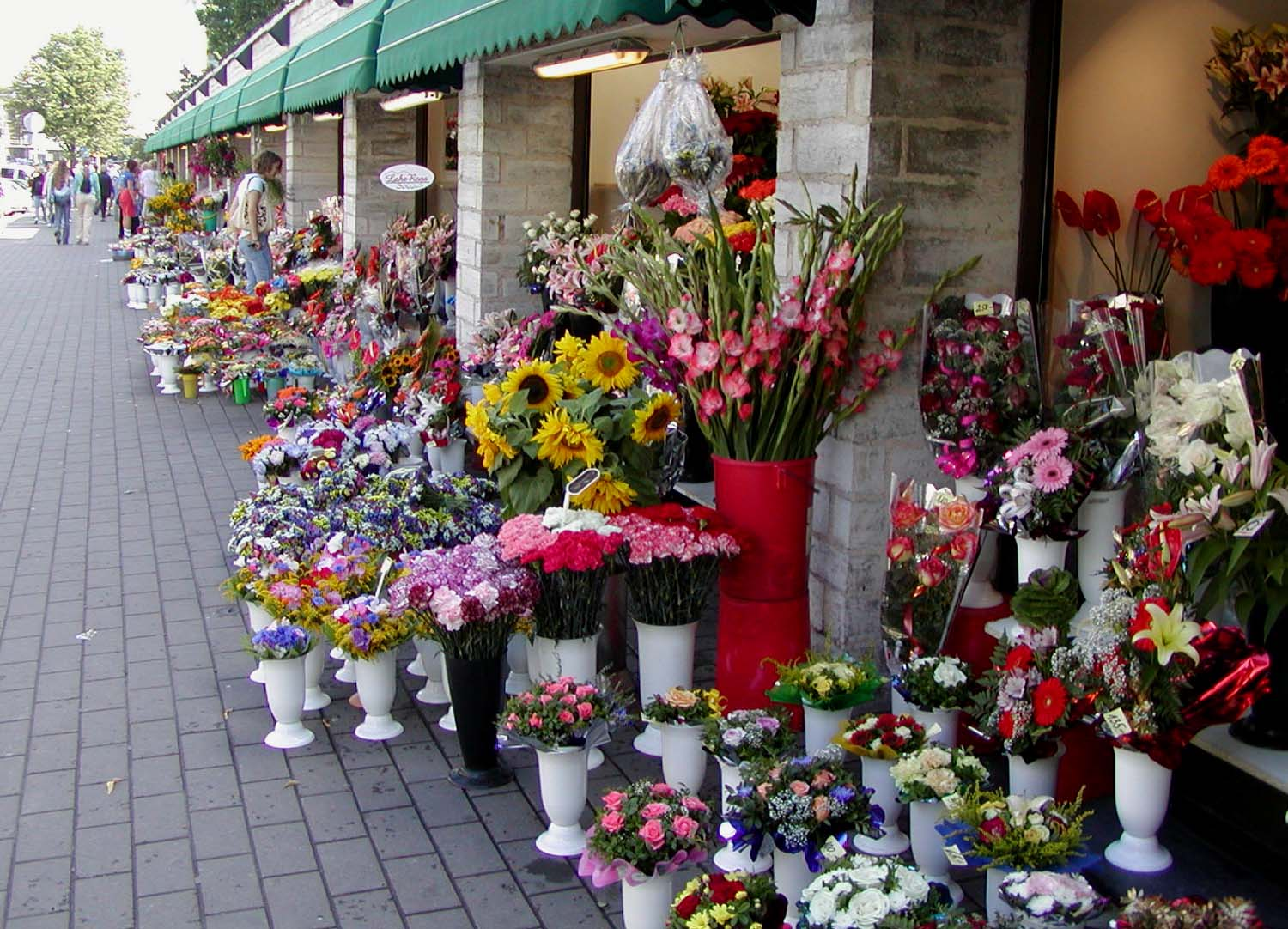
Flower market in Tallinn

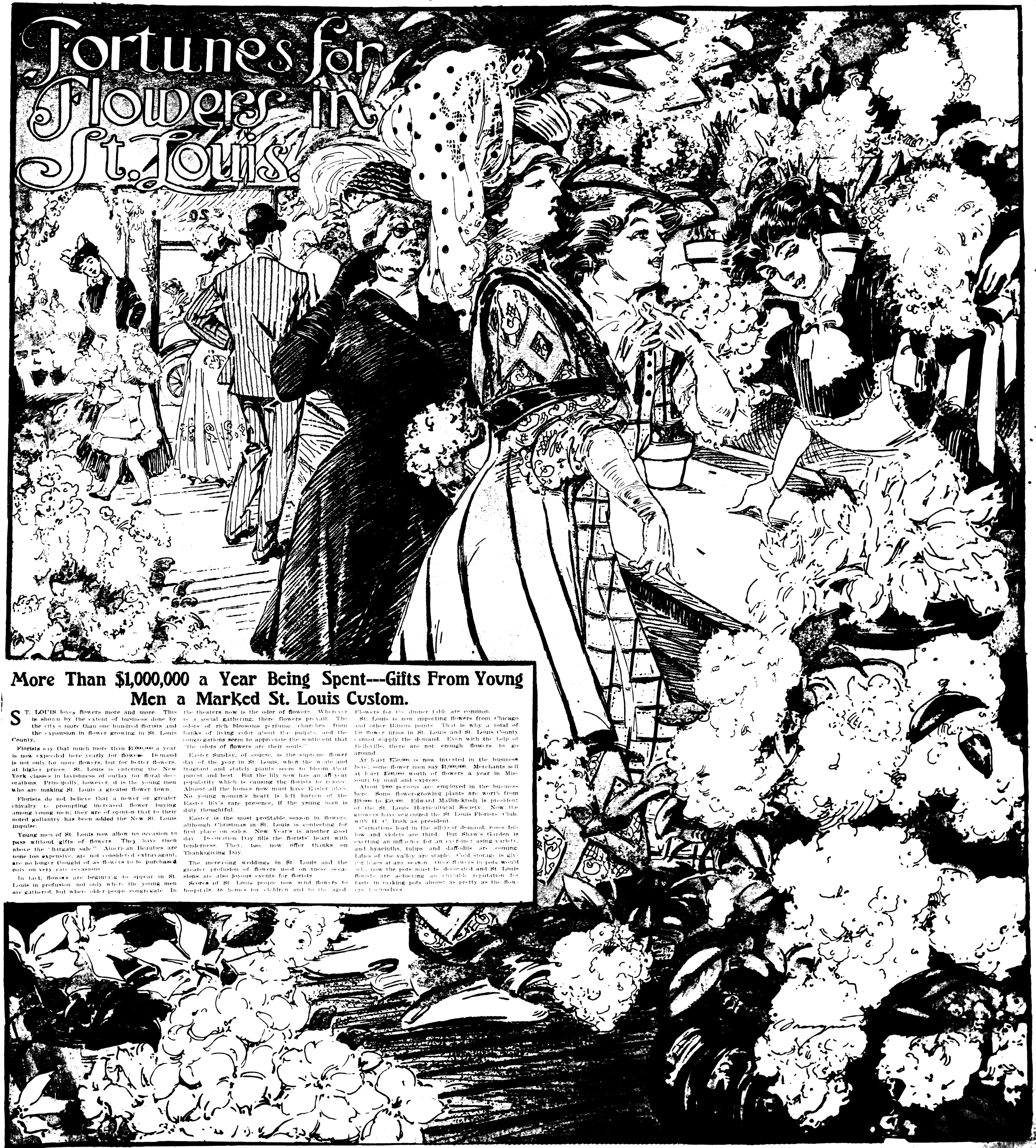
Front page of Sunday Magazine of the St. Louis Post-Dispatch, dated 31 March 1907, shows the interior of a florist's shop. Illustration by Marguerite Martyn.

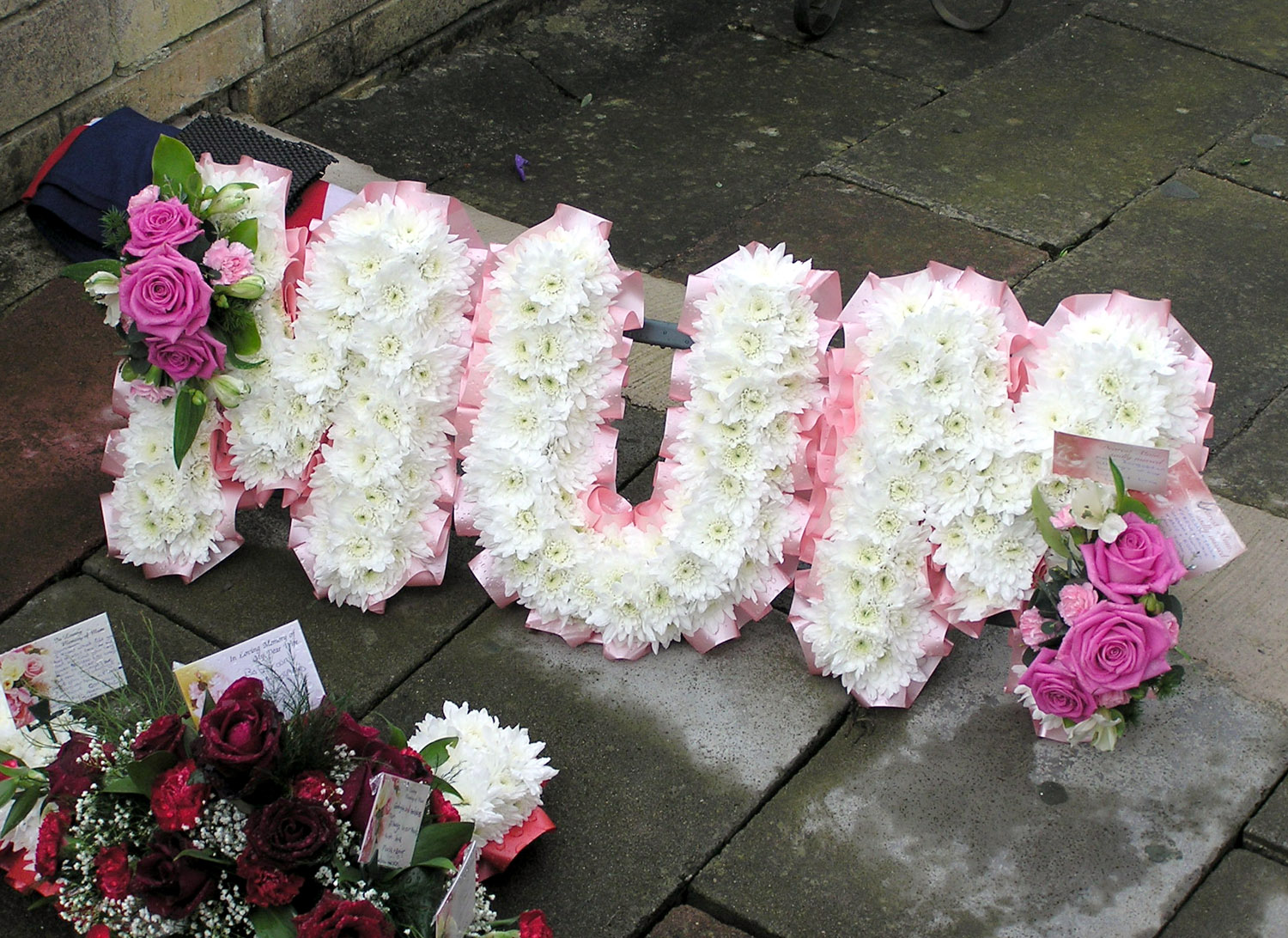
A funeral tribute to "MUM" in chrysanthemums, Bath, England

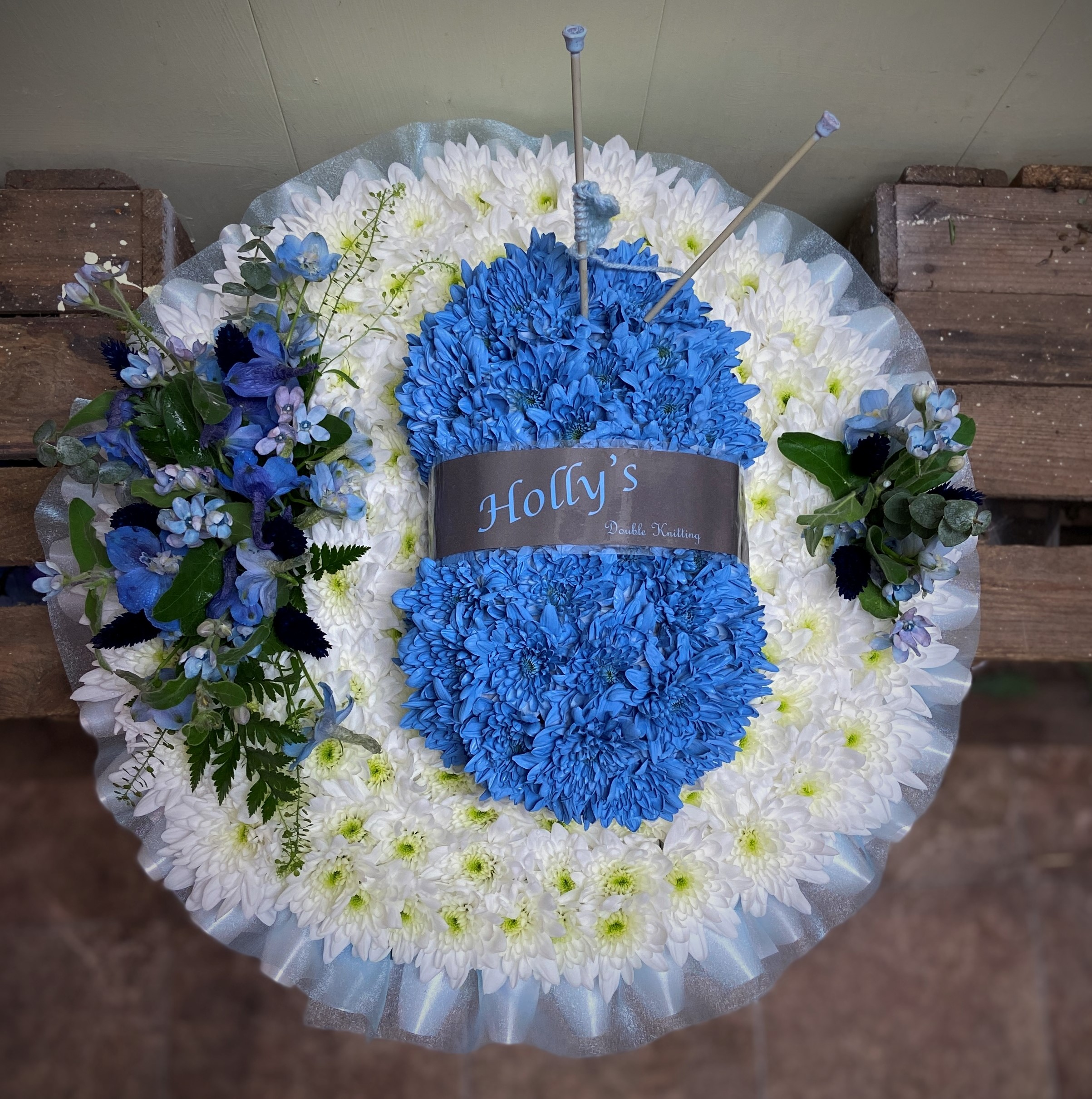
A custom floral design in Fareham, United Kingdom

== Other sources of fresh flowers ==
=== Supermarket flowers ===
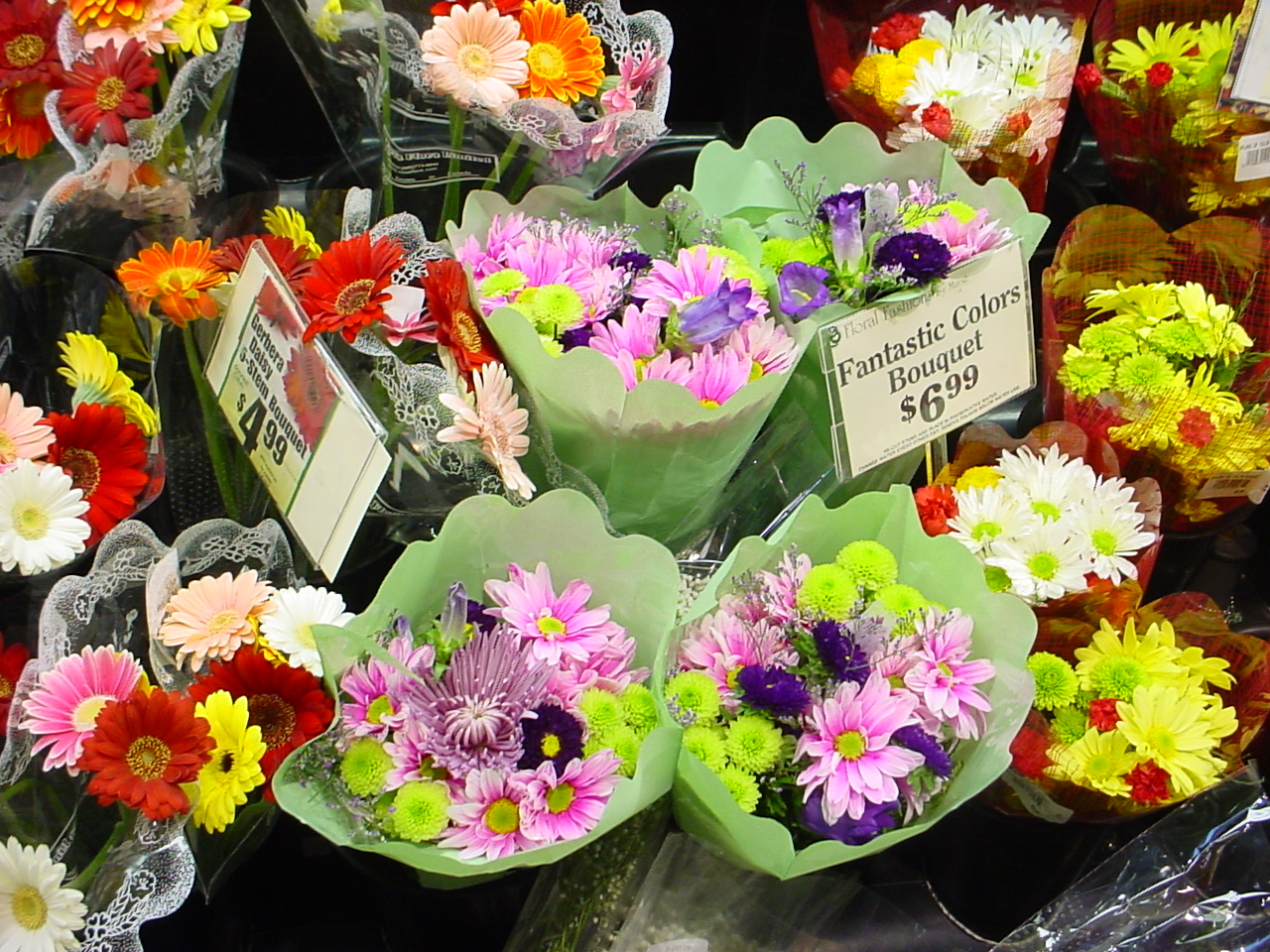
Supermarket display under fluorescent lighting

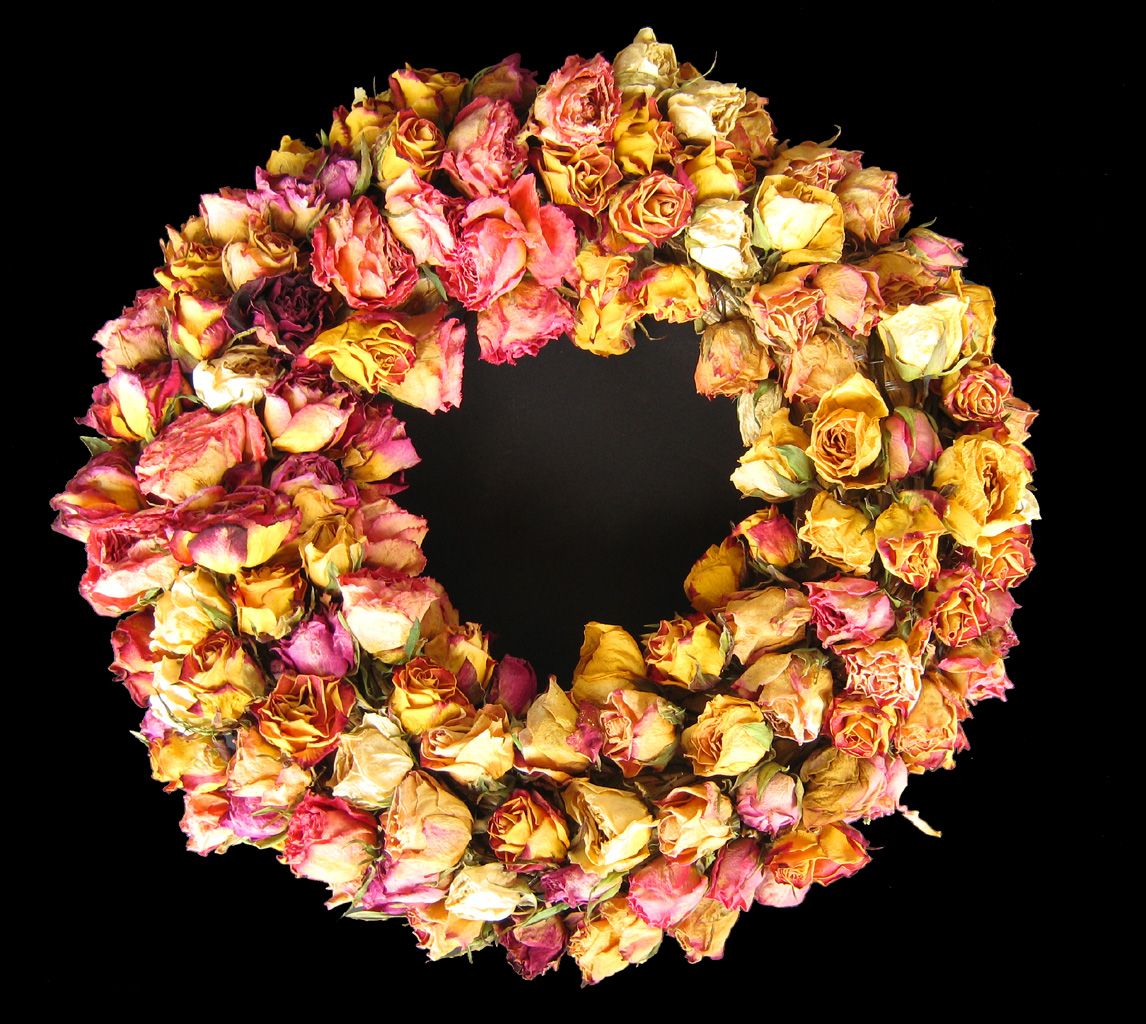
Wreath of dried roses

Cut flowers are widely sold in supermarkets and petrol stations. These outlets offer a limited selection, usually in the form of mixed bouquets and roses by the dozen.

=== Online ordering for delivery ===
In the United States, the number of florists has dropped since a peak of over 27,000 in 1992 to fewer than 20,000 in 2007. The World Wide Web has contributed to this decline by making alternatives more accessible.

Floral wire services play an intermediary by gathering orders to be fulfilled by local florists. Floral wire services take a percentage of customers order value for orders provided through their websites and additional fees for the transmission of orders to local florists.

Some companies ship flowers direct to the consumer, and typically function as order gatherers and will work with local florists to have the order delivered.

== Training ==
Education, both formal and informal, is another significant segment of the floristry industry. Established floristry designers and artists impart their craft to students interested in floral design as hobby or career. Courses are generally available through community colleges, private post-secondary vocational schools, and professional florist trade associations.

In the Netherlands, the first horticultural college was founded in 1896 in Naaldwijk; the second horticultural college was founded in 1897 in Aalsmeer. In 1926, the first national professional qualification examinations in floristry were held in the Netherlands. The horticultural college in Aalsmeer celebrated its 75th anniversary in 1972 and in 1997 its 100th anniversary. Since 1926 is the horticultural college in Aalsmeer was called the Rijks Middelbare Tuinbouw School (RTMS). The first professional floristry education started at the RMTS in 1968. The first professor in floristry at the horticultural college in Aalsmeer was Mr. Theo Boerma. In 1972 Theo Boerma started teaching professional evening courses for the floristry diploma: vakdiploma Bloemist-Winkelier. In 1980 Theo Boerma and his wife José Boerma founded the first privately owned floristry school; Boerma Instituut International Floral Design School in Aalsmeer. The floristry diploma was recognized by the Dutch government until 1996. When the borders of Europe opened, the diploma was no longer needed but professional training for Dutch and international students is still organised by the Boerma Instituut.

== See also ==
- Floral design
- Floriculture, the cultivation of flowers for use in floristry.
- Flower car
- Flower delivery
- History of flower arrangement
- Ikebana, Japanese floristry
- Korean flower arrangement
- Language of flowers
