= Potager du roi, Versailles =

Garden in Versailles

Coordinates: 48°47′55″N 2°7′16″E

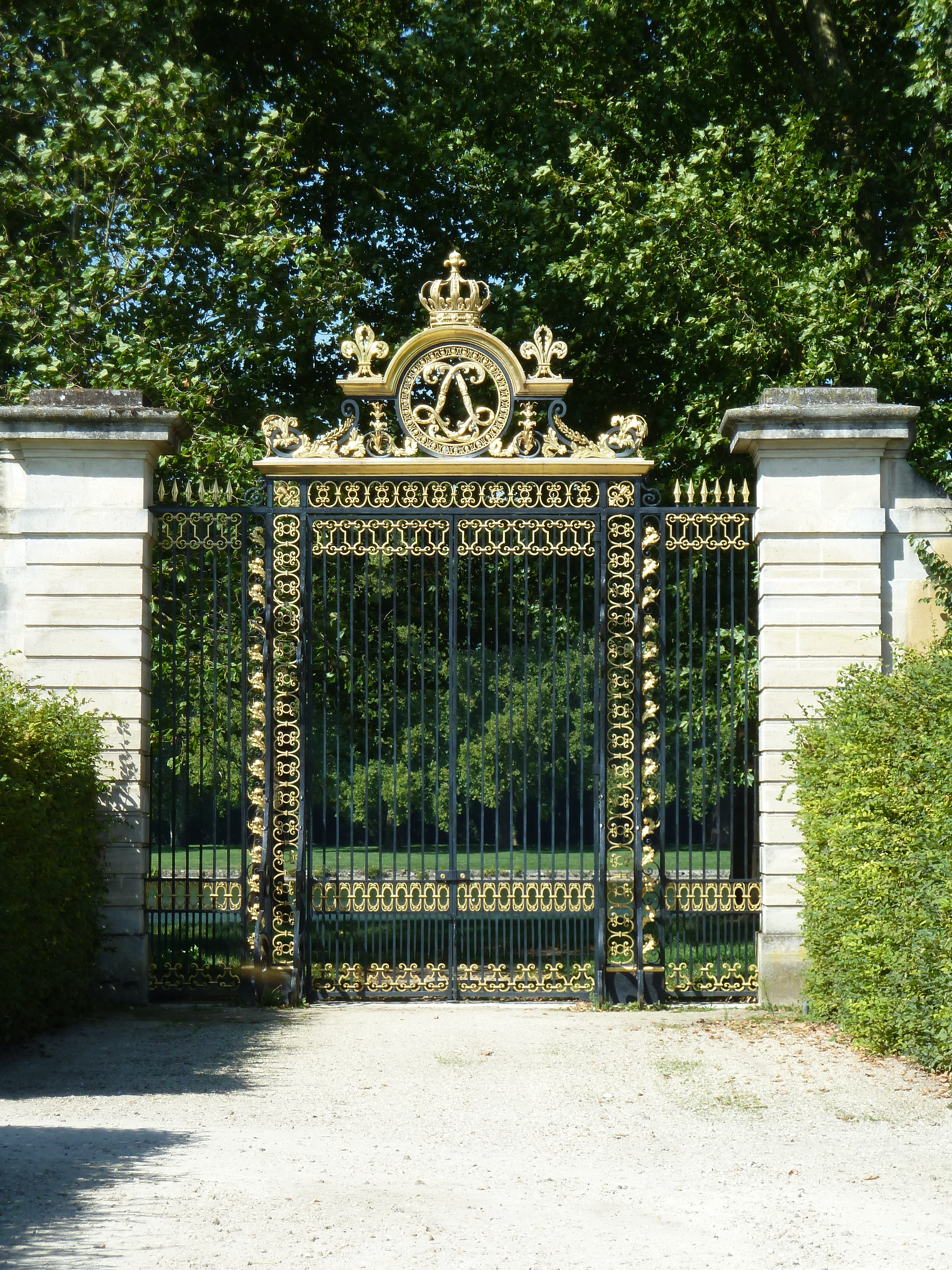
The King's Gate, the monumental entry to the Potager

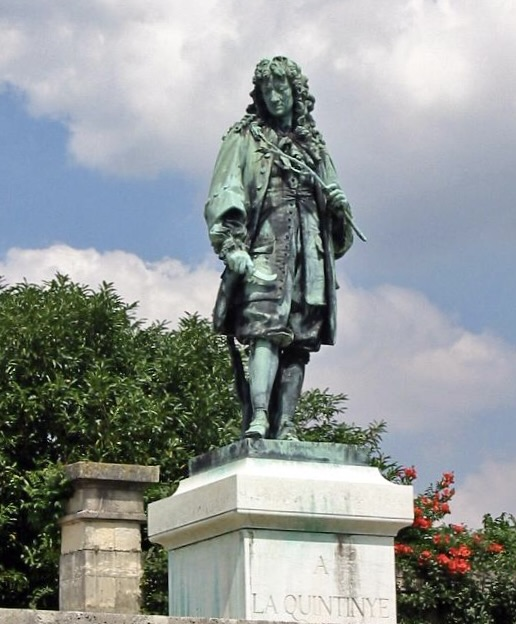
Statue of Jean-Baptiste de La Quintinie at the Potager

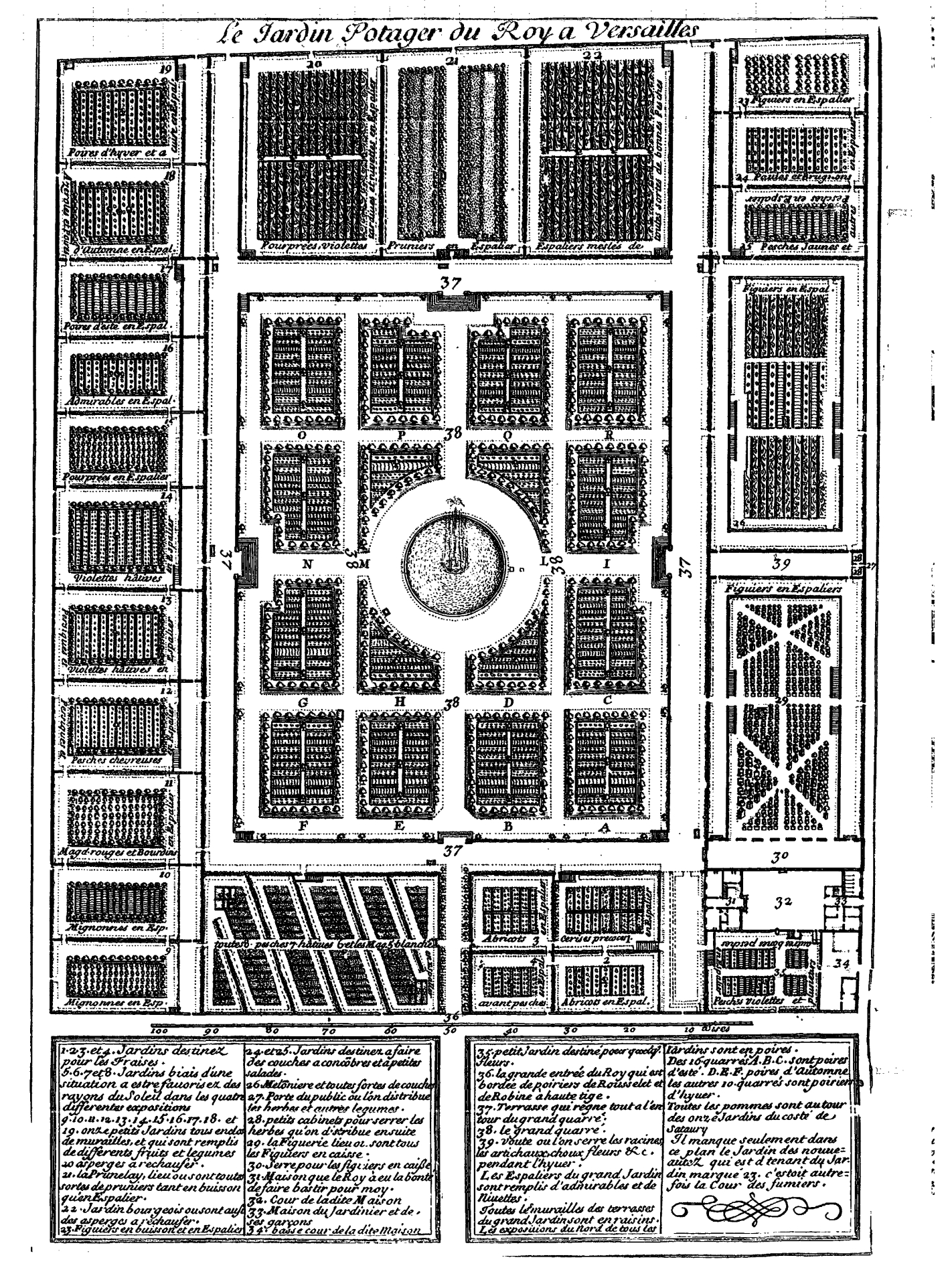
The original plan for the Potager

The Potager du roi (Kitchen Garden of the King), near the Palace of Versailles, produced fresh vegetables and fruits for the table of the court of Louis XIV. It was created between 1678 and 1683 by Jean-Baptiste de La Quintinie, the director of the royal fruit and vegetable gardens. Today it is run by the École nationale supérieure du paysage, the grande école for landscape architects. It is officially recognized as a Remarkable Garden of France.

== Creation of the Potager du roi ==
The Potager du roi was conceived as part of the Palace of Versailles, a showcase for the grandeur of France and its king. To design this complex, Louis XIV engaged the designers of Vaux-le-Vicomte, Nicolas Fouquet's chateau. Jean-Baptiste de La Quintinie had participated in creating the gardens at Vaux-le-Vicomte, and was hired to design and build the Potager and to supply the Court with fruits and vegetables, soon after Louis had arrested Fouquet.

The Potager was installed next to the Pièce d'eau des Suisses so that the King could easily take walks there. However, the location was not suitable for gardening; indeed, it was so swamp-like that it was referred to as the "stinking pond". Therefore, La Quintinie started by installing drains for the excess water and carting in better soil from the hills of Satory.

After this preparatory work, construction continued according to La Quintinie's plans, with François Mansart designing the walls and terraces. The Potager took five years to build (1678–1683) and cost over a million livres.

== The Potager under Louis XIV ==
The finished garden in Louis XIV's time was the model for the modern restoration. It covered twenty-five acres (nine hectares), with a circular pond and fountain in the center which was surrounded by a Grand Carré, a large square, containing sixteen smaller squares for vegetables. Around this was a raised terrace from which the King could watch the gardeners work. A high wall surrounded the Grand Carré, and behind the wall were twenty-nine enclosed gardens with fruit trees and vegetables. The different chambers of the gardens created individual microclimates, which allowed La Quintinie to grow fruits and vegetables out of season.

In his Instruction pour les jardins fruitiers et potagers, on the results obtained by his use of different types of manure, he wrote:

la chaleur, tant dans la terre que dans l'air ne peut régulièrement venir que des rayons du soleil. J'ose dire pourtant que j'ai été assez heureux pour l'imiter en petit à l'égard de quelques petits fruits : j'en ai fait mûrir cinq et six semaines devant le temps, par exemple des fraises à la fin mars, des précoces, et des pois en avril, des figues en juin, des asperges et des laitues pommées en décembre, janvier ...

heat, in the earth as well as in the air, can come regularly only from the rays of the sun. I daresay, however, that I was lucky enough to imitate it a little in regards to some small fruits: I succeeded in making some ripen five or six weeks early, for instance, strawberries at the end of March, early vegetables and peas in April, figs in June, asparagus and lettuces in December, January …

Since Louis XIV was fond of figs, La Quintinie created a special figuerie, a hollowed-out garden, sheltered from the elements in winter, which enabled him to grow figs in mid-June. He also had special gardens for melons; three gardens for "herbs, cucumbers and other green leaves"; and gardens reserved for strawberries and cherries. He raised fifty varieties of pears and twenty varieties of apples for the King's table, and sixteen varieties of lettuce.

During the time of Louis XIV, the potager was an enormous enterprise; it required thirty experienced gardeners to tend to the garden plots, greenhouses, and the twelve thousand trees. Louis XIV brought important visitors, such as the Ambassador of Siam and Doge of Venice, to see the wonders of the garden. He also sent samples of his favorite pear variety, Bon Chrétien, as gifts to other heads of state. The varieties of vegetables served in the garden were an obligatory topic of discussion at the dinner at Versailles. As Madame de Sévigné wrote, "The craze for peas continues; the impatience waiting to eat them, to have eaten them, and the pleasure of eating them are the three subjects our princes have been discussing for the past four days now."

La Quintinie supervised the gardens until his death in 1688. His post was occupied briefly by his colleague, Nicolas Besnard, and then was taken over by François Le Normand in 1690. Le Normand's two sons and their descendants ran the Potager du roi for the next ninety years. They created a new garden for raising asparagus, and had to make major repairs to the garden after the extreme cold spell of 1709.

== The Potager du roi from Louis XV to the French Revolution ==
After the death of Louis XIV in 1715, the court left Versailles, and the budget of the garden was greatly reduced. François II Le Normand made a lawn on the Grand Carré, and experimented with new varieties of plants. A coffee plant had been given to Louis XIV by the Lord mayor of Amsterdam; Le Normand succeeded in growing twelve coffee plants four meters high in the greenhouse of the garden, so Louis XV could serve coffee grown in his own garden.

The Court of Louis XV returned to Versailles in 1723, and Louis Le Normand, who became director of the Potager du roi after the death of his brother François, replanted the Grand Carré with herbs and lettuces. He also built a Dutch greenhouse, a low greenhouse with a rounded roof, where, starting in 1735, he was able to raise pineapples. By the time of the French Revolution, there were eight hundred pineapple plants in the greenhouses.

Jacques-Louis Le Normand succeeded Louis as the head of the Potager in 1750. He built three new heated greenhouses, and expanded the scientific work of the garden. The garden no longer provided ordinary vegetables and fruits to the Court at Versailles, but only rare and special fruits. Le Normand experimented with rare varieties of plants, such as Euphorbia, jasmine, Latania palms, and bananas brought back by French explorers.

Jacques-Louis Le Normand, the last member of the family to direct the Potager du roi, died in 1782, and the garden came under the direction of Alexandre Brown, of English origin, who was the gardener at the royal garden at Choisy. Brown renovated the garden, reducing the size of the pond in the center, and tearing down the walls between eleven gardens on the north terrace to create five.

In 1785, the Count of Provence, brother of Louis XVI and future Louis XVIII, bought for himself and his mistress, Anne de Caumont La Force, the Countess of Balbi, a property adjoining the Potager du roi. He then commissioned his architect, Jean-François Chalgrin, to design and build a country house (known as Le pavillon de la pièce d'eau des Suisses) and an English garden, the Parc Balbi on the estate. The new garden had a winding stream, islands, and a belvedere atop an artificial grotto, in the picturesque style of the time. In 1798, the pavillon and garden features were demolished, but traces of the alleys and the lake are still visible.

== The Potager du roi from the French Revolution to today ==
In 1793, during the French Revolution, the garden plots were rented out and the tools and plants, including the eight hundred pineapple plants, were auctioned off. In 1795, the Convention, the revolutionary government, declared the Potager to be a national institute, the tenant farmers were ejected, and the garden became a school and scientific center.

When the monarchy was restored after the fall of Napoleon, much of the garden was overgrown, and many of the trees had died. The new director, Count Lelieur, replanted the orchards and resumed the growing of early vegetables. New greenhouses heated with hot water were installed in 1829, which allowed growing of more exotic tropical fruits and vegetables, and, in 1840, bananas were successfully grown in the Large Greenhouse.

In 1848, the potager became part of the new Institut national agronomique at Versailles, and, the following year, was put under the direction of Auguste Hardy, an agronomist. Hardy directed the school under the Second Republic, the Second Empire, and the Third Republic. In 1874, the school became the École nationale d'horticulture (ENH). Under Hardy, the garden grew nine thousand species of vegetables, 309 varieties of apples, 557 varieties of pears, and 94 varieties of peaches.

Hardy died in 1891, and Jules Nanot became director. The school began to teach landscape architecture as well as horticulture; between 1892 and 1905, this course was taught by the famed landscape gardener Édouard André, then by André's son, René Édouard André. A separate department of landscape architecture and the art of gardens was begun in 1945.

In 1961, the ENH became an École Supérieure and, in 1976, the École nationale supérieure du paysage (ENSP) was created, and attached to the ENH. In 1995, the ENH moved to Angers, and the ENSP took responsibility for the Potager du roi.

Today the garden is open to the public and annually produces over fifty tons of fruits and thirty tons of vegetables, which are sold in Versailles markets and at the school. About 400 varieties of fruit trees and many varieties of vegetables are grown at the Potager, making more exotic fruits and vegetables available to the French public. In addition to teaching, the school regularly re-introduces historic varieties and carries on an extensive program of experimentation. Students come with at least two years' prior university education, and spend a further four years studying at Versailles, including carrying out studies on their own small plots, and planning and executing a project on a particular terrain.

The garden is included on the World Monuments Fund's 2018 list of monuments at risk to highlight its need to widen its supporter base and adapt to climate change.

== Gallery ==
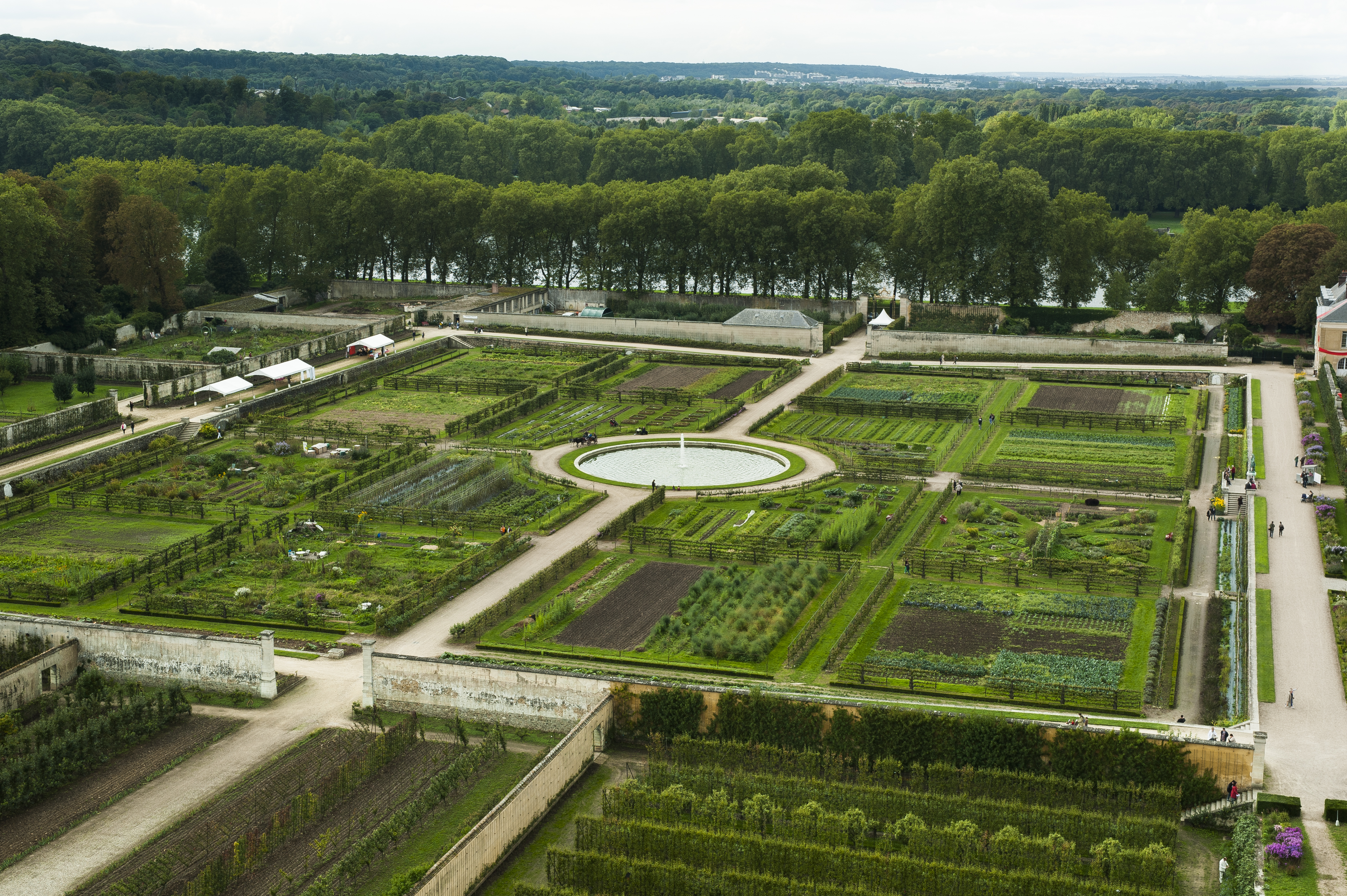
Aerial view

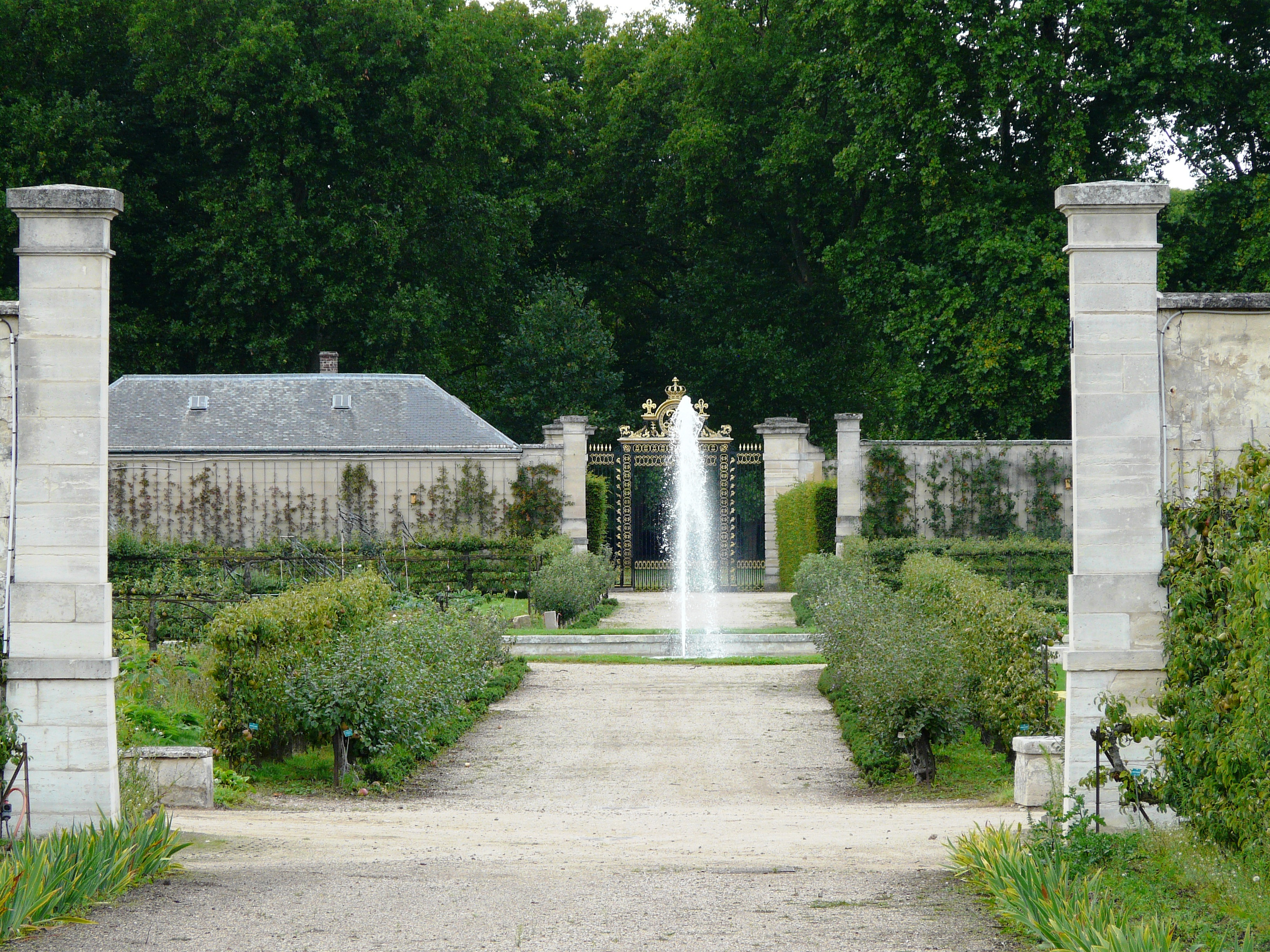
The central alleyway

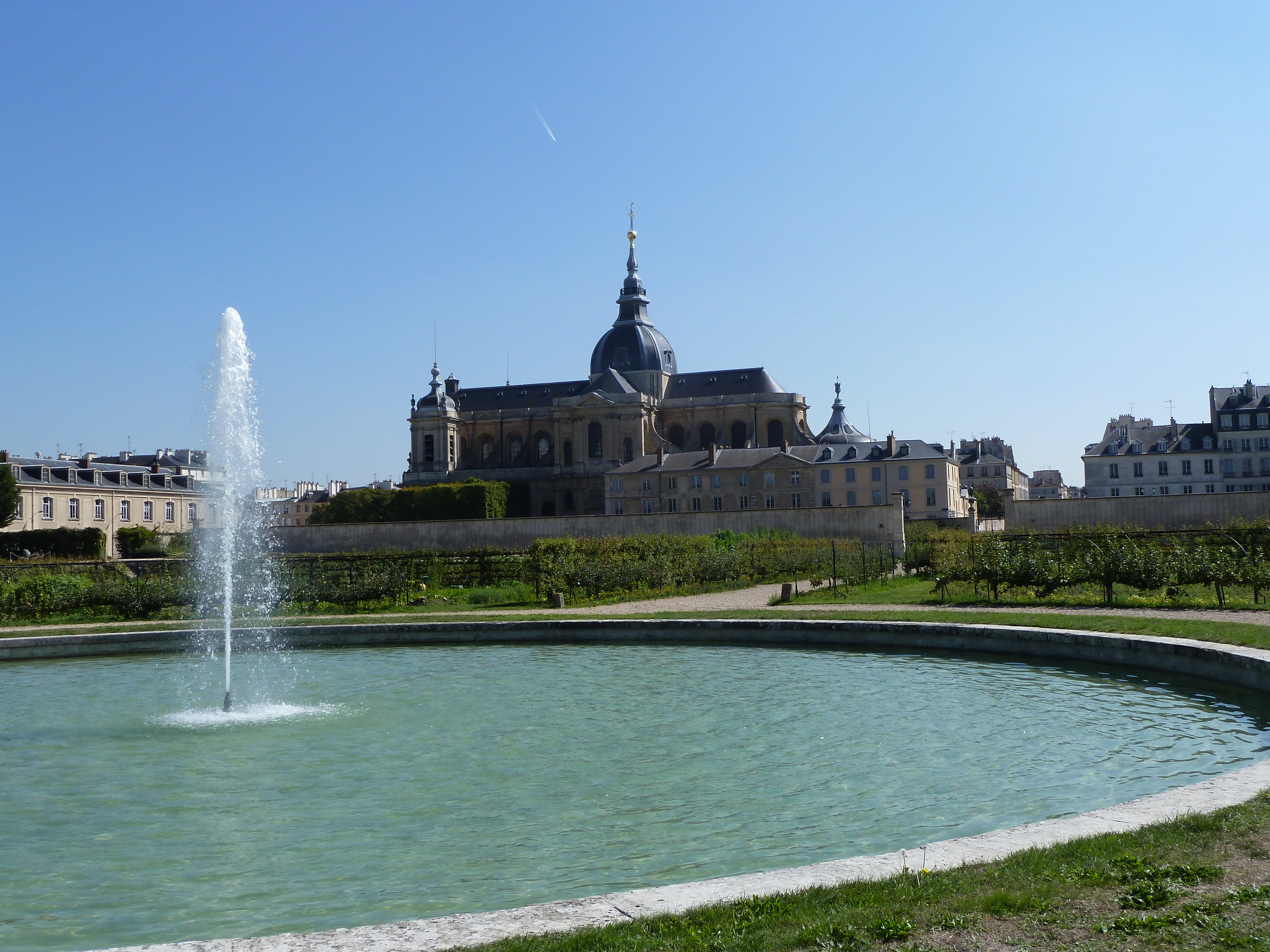
Le grand bassin

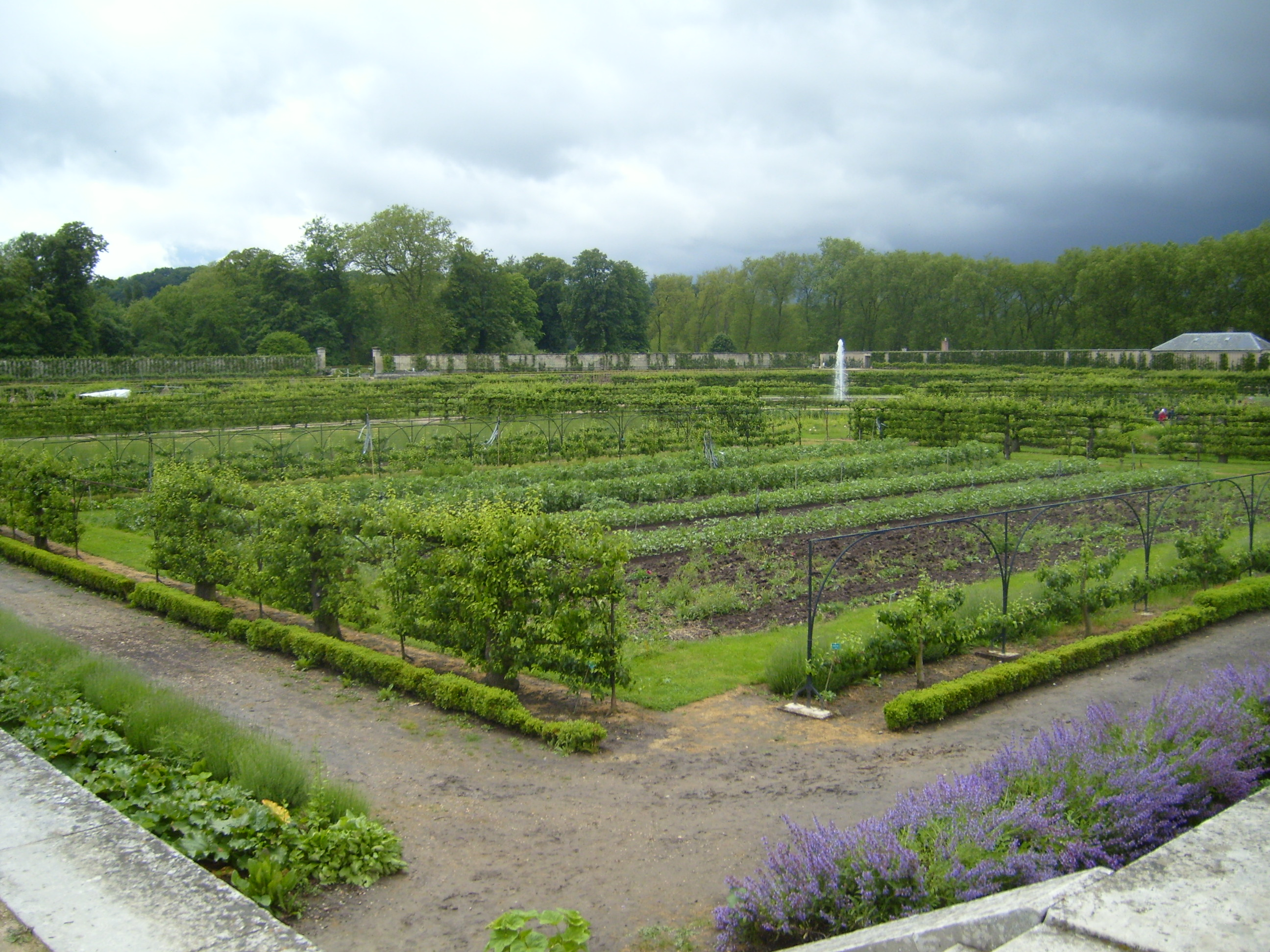
Grand Carré of the Potager

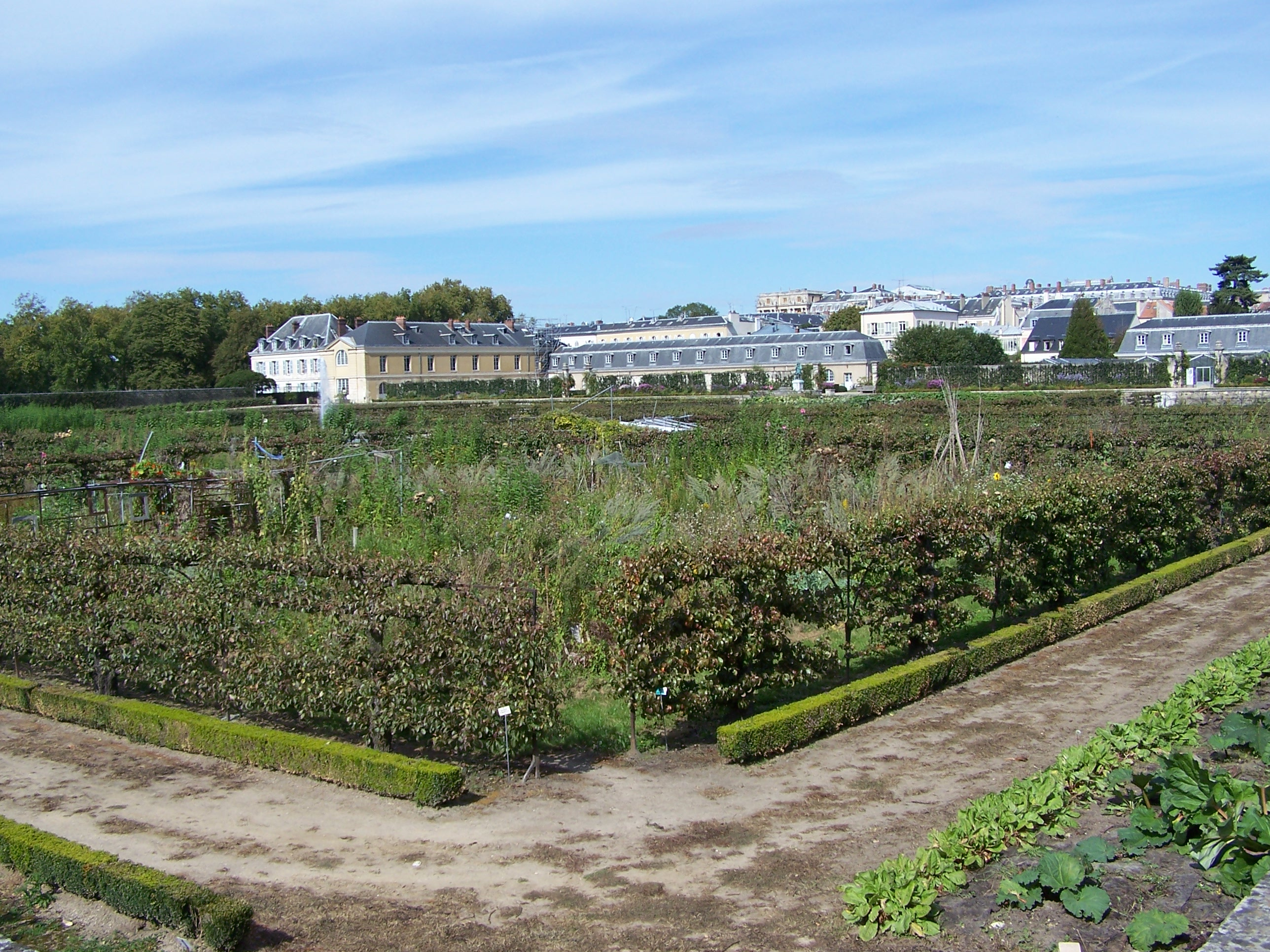
Student gardens

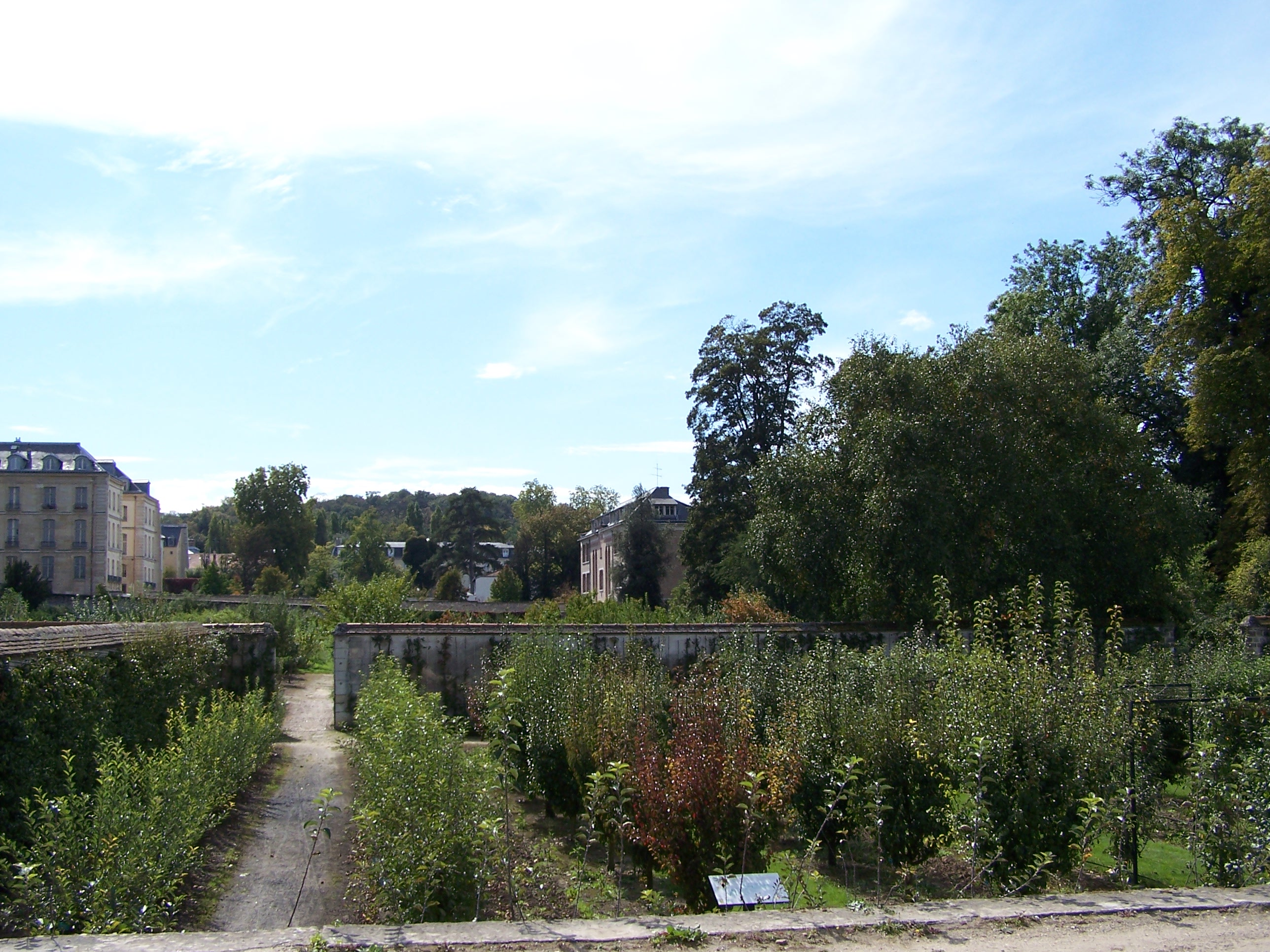
Orchard of apple and pear trees

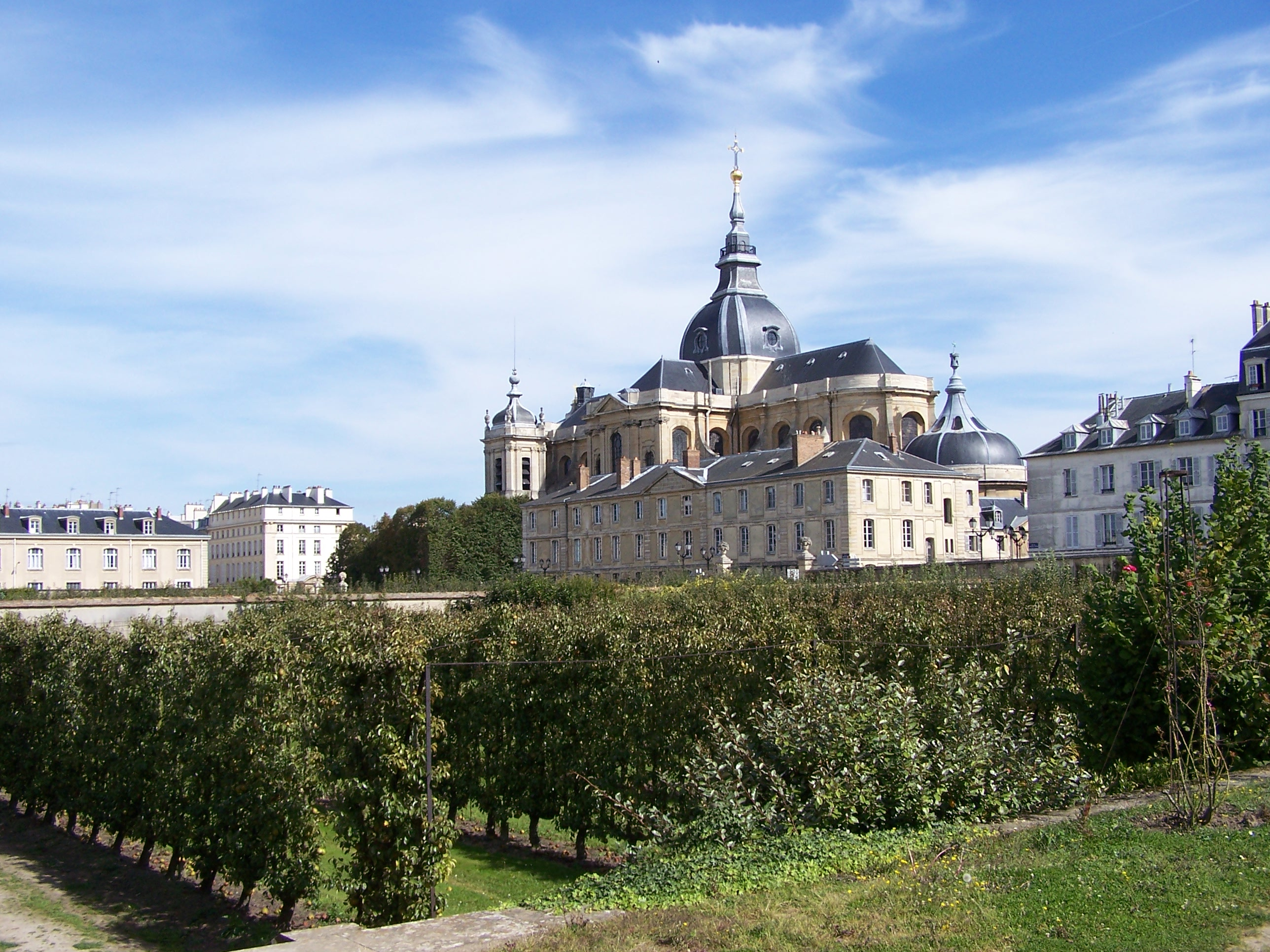
The Lelieur orchard and the cathedral of Saint-Louis

== Bibliography ==
- Stéphanie de Courtois, Le Potager du roi, The King’s Vegetable Garden. École Nationale Supérieure du Paysage and Actes Sud: Versailles and Arles, 2003. ISBN 978-2-7427-4505-0
- Jean-Baptiste de la Quintinie, Instruction pour les jardins fruitiers et potagers, École Nationale Supérieure du Paysage and Actes Sud: Versailles and Arles, 1999. ISBN 2-7427-2496-6
