= Jean-Baptiste de La Quintinie =

French Lawyer & Royal Gardener (1626-1688)

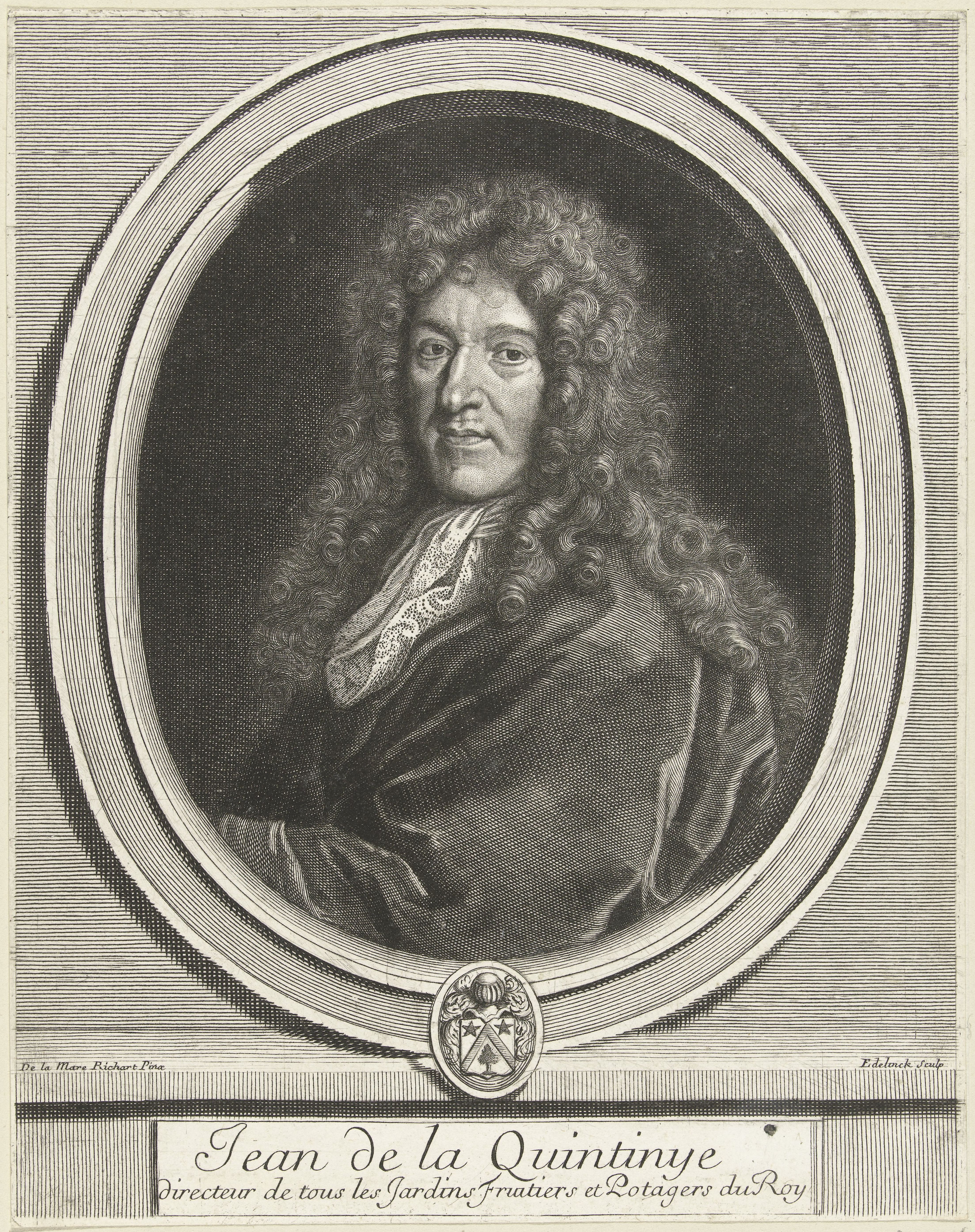
- Born: 1 March 1626; Chabanais, France
- Died: 11 November 1688 (aged 62); Versailles, France
- Occupations: Lawyer, gardener, agronomist
- Known for: Potager du roi

Jean-Baptiste de La Quintinie (1 March 1626 – 11 November 1688) was a French lawyer, gardener and agronomist who served under Louis XIV. Named director of the royal fruit and vegetable gardens by the king in 1670, La Quintinie created the potager du roi ("King's vegetable garden") for the Palace of Versailles between 1678 and 1683.

== Biography ==
Jean-Baptiste de La Quintinie was born on 1 March 1626, in Chabanais, Angoumois, France. He was the second of the three sons of Guillaume de La Quintinie, a tax prosecutor, and Françoise Morand, a daughter of a surgeon family, . He studied at the Jesuit college of Poitiers. Destined for a legal career, he continued his education at the Faculty of Law of the same town. He then left his native region for Paris where he became a lawyer at the Parliament.

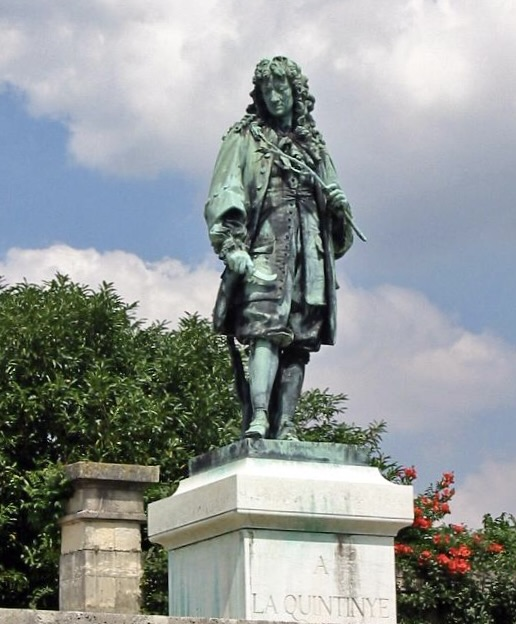
Statue of La Quintinie in the Potager du Roi, Versailles

In Paris, La Quintinie was praised for his writing skills and was tasked with instructing the only son of Jean Tambonneau, president of the general accounting office. La Quintinie accompanied the son on a trip to Italy and, impressed by the gardens he visited there, became fascinated by horticulture. Shortly after his return from Italy, he gave up his legal pursuits to devote himself fully to gardening. He read the works of ancient authors dealing with agronomy, such as Columella, Varro, Virgil or Pliny the Elder and practiced skills in the gardens of the Hôtel Tambonneau.

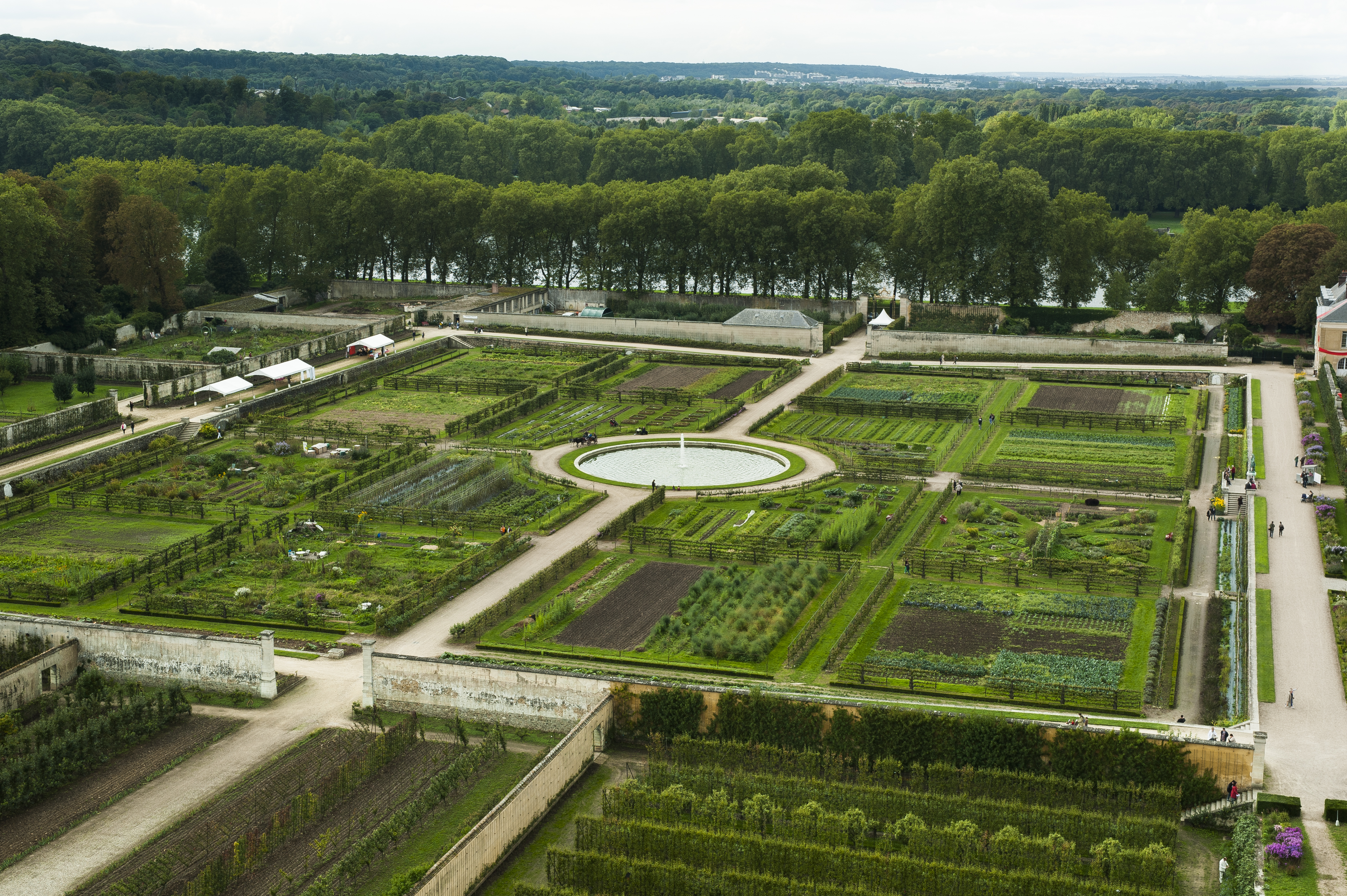
Potager du roi, Versailles

La Quintinie visited England twice and earned the esteem of King James II, who offered him the job of managing his gardens. The Frenchman declined the offer, preferring to return to his home country.

In 1662, La Quintinie married Marguerite Joubert, with whom he had three sons; Jean, Michel, and Gabriel.

La Quintinie acquired skills and a reputation for creating magnificent gardens that permitted him to work for Louis II de Bourbon-Condé in Chantilly, Jean-Baptiste Colbert in Sceaux and Nicolas Fouquet in Vaux-le-Vicomte and to collaborate with André Le Nôtre, Charles Le Brun and Louis Le Vau. Following the disgrace of the superintendent of finance (Nicolas Fouquet) in 1661, Louis XIV gave La Quintinie the job of designing and managing the Versailles vegetable garden. In1670, the king created the title of Director of the royal fruit and vegetable gardens for him.

Between 1678 and 1683, La Quintinie designed and built the Potager du roi. The location was chosen for its proximity to the Palace of Versailles, which was referred to as the 'stinking pond', referring to a parcel that was so wet as to not be suitable for most types of gardening. Once the nine-hectare site had been drained and filled in,^{:9} it was divided into a central square and 29 enclosed gardens.

Coat of arms chosen by La Quintinie

Built with the objective of supplying the tables of the royal court with fresh produce, the potager du roi provided several tons of fruit and vegetables each year. The garden also became a site for horticultural experiments. To satisfy the king's desires, La Quintinie developed cultivation techniques for off-season production – strawberries at the end of March,^{:11}, asparagus in winter or lettuce in December. He also contributed to the improvement of the cultivation of fruit trees, particularly their pruning, an activity that the king enjoyed practising himself.

In 1687, La Quintinie was ennobled by Louis XIV and chose a chevron azure with two stars and a tree as his coat of arms.

La Quintinie died on 11 November 1688 in Versailles. A few days after, Louis XIV said to his wife, "Madame, we have suffered a great loss that we can never repair".

== Gardening manual ==
In 1690, his second son, Michel de La Quintinie, supervised the posthumous publication of Instruction pour les jardins fruitiers et potagers, avec un Traité des orangers, suivi de quelques réflexions sur l'agriculture ("Instruction for fruit and vegetable gardens, with a treatise on orange trees, followed by some thoughts on agriculture"). The work was published in two volumes by Editions Claude Barbin.

== Bibliography ==
Garrigue, Dominique (2001). Jardin et jardinier de Versailles au grand siècle. Edition Champs Vallon ISBN 2876733374

Menapace, Luc (2019). Jean de La Quintinie, créateur du Potager du roi, Le blog de Gallica, 6 novembre 2019 https://gallica.bnf.fr/blog/06112019/jean-de-la-quintinie-createur-du-potager-du-roi?mode=desktop

Perrault, Charles (1697–1700). Les hommes illustres. Tome 2 / qui ont paru en France pendant ce siècle, avec leurs portraits au naturel (in Old French). pp. 84–85.http://catalogue.bnf.fr/ark:/12148/cb438942897
