= Bloomex =

Canadian florist

- Type: Private
- Industry: Floral delivery
- Founded: 2005; 21 years ago
- Founder: Dimitri Lokhonia
- Headquarters: Ottawa, Ontario
- Areas served: Australia, Canada, New Zealand, United States
- Revenue: 38,75 millions $ (2025)
- Net income: 1,125 millions $ (2025)
- Number of employees: 150 (2025)
- Website: bloomex.ca

Bloomex is a national Canadian floral company offering various floral and gift arrangements throughout Canada, Australia, New Zealand and the United States via its online order system. The company, headquartered in Ottawa, Ontario, is privately held by its founder and president, Dimitri Lokhonia.

== Business model ==
Bloomex is a floristry business that ships flower arrangements and other gift related items direct to consumers. The company was established in 2005 and maintains its headquarters and call centre in Ottawa. The company owns virtual telephone numbers that connect customers to the Ottawa call center when they dial a number in their local area code.

== Controversy ==
On March 1, 2008, Toronto Star business and consumer affairs columnist Ellen Roseman reported on Bloomex online complaints, offering one customer's experience with a promised same-day delivery as an example of company unresponsiveness. In a follow-up Star column the next week, company president Lokhonia examined Roseman's late-delivery example, explaining that the order was entered past the deadline for same-day delivery, it was delivered according to the company's published terms and conditions, and the company never refunds delivery charges in such cases in order to maintain its low prices. Lokhonia also alleged that some complaints were actually written by small retail florists in competition with Bloomex, a statement that drew fresh online complaints.

In June 2008, Bloomex issued a press release admitting that the company had made mistakes in the past due to unexpectedly strong sales growth, and announced new systems to improve customer satisfaction.

In November 2022, the Australian consumer organisation Choice awarded Bloomex a Shonky Award after the company accepted an order for six “extra large” bunches of flowers in glass vases for a funeral, with only a single bunch of dead daisies delivered at 2 am on the day after the event.

In December 2022, the Australian Competition & Consumer Commission initiated legal proceedings against Bloomex, alleging the publication of misleading online star ratings and false statements that prices were discounted.

The Australian Federal Court ordered the online florist Bloomex to pay a $1,000,000 fine on March 15, 2024, after the Australian Competition and Consumer Commission (ACCC) found the company guilty of deceptive marketing, fake reviews, and hidden extra fees.

In New Zealand the Commerce Commission is undertaking a compliance project to look at how Bloomex operates in that country.

== See also ==
- Floral industry
- Floral wire service
- Online flower delivery
