= Interflora =

Flower delivery network

Interflora logo

Interflora is a flower delivery network, associated with over 58,000 affiliated flower shops in over 140 countries. It is a subsidiary of Teleflora, itself a subsidiary of The Wonderful Company.

== History ==
In 1920 a florist, Joe Dobson, of Leighton's Seedsmen and Florists in Glasgow, and a nurseryman, Carl Englemann in Saffron Walden, Essex were looking to increase their business. They knew of the Florists Telegraph Delivery Association (now known as Florists' Transworld Delivery) which had existed in the US since 1910, and applied to join as foreign members. In 1923 the UK arm of the FTDA was formed with 17 members. One of the straplines used in advertising was Flowers by Wire when the telegraph was actually used to communicate between florists. Later, telegrams were sent from member to member requesting deliveries to be made in the recipient florists area. In the original Interflora Directory, used by members, the longest established members could be recognised by their telegraphic addresses. This would be the only telegraphic address in that city to include the name Interflora. In the case of the founding members, their telegraphic addresses were "Interflora Glasgow" and "Interflora Saffron Walden", respectively.

In 1953 the name changed to Interflora and the slogan Flowers Worldwide along with the Mercury Man roundel became well known. "Say it with Flowers" became the subsequent and most famous slogan associated with Interflora.

When telegrams became obsolete the most used method for requesting deliveries was by telephone. Following that Interflora brought in messenger1 in the mid to late 1980s, this system was very similar to sending a fax. In the late 1990s messenger2 was introduced, that used the internet to transmit orders.

In the early 2000s, Interflora brought out a system called Rose, this used the internet but instead of a dial-up connection a broadband connection was used. This enabled orders to be transmitted in real time. In 2011 Rose was updated to ROSEGold which provides a real time service between the call centre in Sleaford, Lincolnshire and the Interflora members around the United Kingdom.

In 2005, the Interflora British Unit moved from being a trade association to a private equity ownership under investment company, 3i.

3i sold British Interflora to US-based FTD Group, the successor to Florists' Transworld Delivery, in 2006.

In 2008, United Online Software Development acquired Interflora and FTD.

In 2012, Interflora bought the Gifts Division of Flying Brands.

In November 2013, United Online spun off its floral delivery subsidiary, FTD, which became a separate NASDAQ-traded company called FTD Companies, Inc., under the symbol FTD.

In June 2019, after the FTD Group filed for bankruptcy, they sold Interflora British Unit in a $59.5 million deal to another US-based flower delivery network, Teleflora, a subsidiary of The Wonderful Company since 1979.

== See also ==
- Floral industry
- Cut flowers
