= Untied =

Untied may refer to:

- Untied.com, a website critical of United Airlines
- Untied (album), a 2000 album by The Ten Tenors
- "Untied", a 1955 single by Tommy Collins
- "Untied", a song on the 1992 album On the Mouth
- "Untied", a song on the 1997 album Start. Stop.
- "Untied", a song on the 1999 album Laced

== See also ==
- United (disambiguation)
- Untied aid, assistance funds which are not limited to being spent on goods and services from specified countries
- Untide Press, an American poetry publisher
