= Live in Madrid =

Live in Madrid may refer to:

== Albums ==
- Live in Madrid, a 1997 album by English guitarist Mick Abrahams.
- Live in Madrid, a 2006 live album by Norwegian band TNT.
- Hecho en España, a 2007 live album by Mexican group RBD.
- Amigos Para Siempre, a 2009 live album by Australian band The Ten Tenors.
- Live in Madrid, a 2011 live extended play by British band Coldplay.
