= Tenology =

Greatest hits album by The Ten Tenors
- Released: August 1, 2005
- Genre: Pop; pop-opera
- Language: English, Spanish, Italian
- Label: Warner Music Australia

The Ten Tenors chronology
Larger than Life (2004)	Tenology (2005)	Here's to the Heroes (2006)

Tenology is the first greatest hits album from Australian vocal group The Ten Tenors. Tracks 1,3,4,5,6,8,9,10,14 from album “Larger Than Life”, 2004. Track 2 from album “One Is Not Enough” European Edition, 2002. Track 7 from album “Colours”, 1999. Track 11 from album “A Not So Silent Night”, 2001. Tracks 12, 13 from album “Larger Than Life” Bonus Live CD, 2004.

== Track listing ==
No.	Title	Writer(s)	Length
1.	"Water / Va Pensiero"
2.	"Italian Medley: Mattinata / Santa Lucia / Volare (Nel blu di pinto di blu)"	Teodoro Cottrau / Ruggero Leoncavallo / Franco Migliacci / Domenico Modugno	7:24
3.	"World Anthem"	Lee Holdridge / Molly-Ann Leikin	4:00
4.	"The Way Away from You"
5.	"Sundance"
6.	"Stonde"
7.	"Mama"
8.	"Por una Cabeza"	Carlos Gardel / Alfredo Le Pera
9.	"Conquest of Paradise"
10.	"Cast in Stone"
11.	"Veni, Veni Emmanuel"
12.	"Opera Without the Boring Bits" (live)	Luigi Illica / Giacomo Puccini / Giuseppe Verdi	10:32
13.	"Bohemian Rhapsody" (live)	Freddie Mercury
14.	"Bicycle Race"	Freddie Mercury

== Charts ==
=== Weekly charts ===
Chart (2005–06)	Peak position
Australian Albums (ARIA)	8
New Zealand Albums (RMNZ)	21

=== Year-end charts ===
Year	Chart	Position
2005	Australian ARIA Charts	68
2005	Australian Classical ARIA Charts	4
2006	Australian Classical ARIA Charts	14

== Certifications ==
Region	Certification	Certified units/sales
Australia (ARIA)	Platinum	70,000^{^}
^{^} Shipments figures based on certification alone.

== Release history ==
Region	Date	Label	Format	Catalogue number
Australia	1 August 2005	Warner Music Australia	CD, digital download	5046795562
