= Double Platinum (disambiguation) =

Double platinum is a type of music recording sales certification.

Double Platinum may also refer to:

- Double Platinum (film), a 1999 telemovie
- Double Platinum (Kiss album) (1978)
- Double Platinum (The Ten Tenors album) (2011)
