= List of Delta Sigma Phi members =

The list of Delta Sigma Phi members includes notable people who are or were once a member of the Delta Sigma Phi fraternity.

== Academia ==
Name	Chapter	Class	Notability	Ref.
Lawrence Biondi	Loyola	1974	President of St. Louis University	
Robert Carothers	Edinboro of PA	1962	President of the University of Rhode Island	
Ross S. Whaley	Michigan	1959	President of the State University of New York College of Environmental Science and Forestry	
Eric Webber	Texas	1979	Professor University of Texas, Austin	

== Business ==
Name	Chapter	Class	Notability	Ref.
Frank T. Cary	Hillsdale	1941	Chairman and CEO of IBM	
Joel S. Demski	Michigan	1962	President of American Accounting Association	
Mike Duke	Georgia Tech	1968	CEO of Wal-Mart	
John M. Harbert	Auburn	1946	Billionaire businessman and founder of Harbert Corporation	
John Walden	Illinois	1979	CEO of Home Retail Group PLC	
Charles Walgreen III	Michigan	1955	President and CEO of Walgreens	

== Entertainment ==
Name	Chapter	Class	Notability	Ref.
J. Marty Dormany	Florida State	1991	Emmy winning graphic designer, executive producer	
Jason Drucker	Florida	2023	Actor	
Cody Ko	Duke		Comedian and YouTuber	
Rob Little	Central Michigan		Comedian	
Gary Lockwood	UCLA	1956	Actor known for Star Trek and 2001: A Space Odyssey	
Steve Pepoon	Kansas State	1975	co-creator of The Wild Thornberrys	

== Military ==
Name	Chapter	Class	Notability	Ref.
Robert Conway	St. Francis College	1972	Vice Admiral, US Navy	
James W. Holsinger	Duke	1958	United States Army general	
Richard Winters	Franklin and Marshall	1941	World War II hero, inspiration for Band of Brothers	

== Politics and government ==
Name	Chapter	Class	Notability	Ref.
Albert P. Brewer	Alabama	1948	Governor of Alabama	
James J. Davis	Pittsburgh	1923	Secretary of Labor of the United States	
Michael Deaver	San Jose State	1959	Assistant White House Chief of Staff, Reagan Administration	
William Eacho	Duke	1976	US Ambassador to Austria	
Tom Harkin	Iowa State	1960	United States Senator	
Mike Hayden	Kansas State University	1964	Governor of Kansas	
Mark Martin	Western Carolina	1985	Chief Justice of the North Carolina Supreme Court 2014- 2019	
John E. McLaughlin	Wittenberg	1961	Deputy and interim director of the Central Intelligence Agency	
David Perdue	Georgia Tech	1969	United States Senator	
Todd Tiahrt	SD School of Mines	1970	United States House of Representatives,	
Mike Turner	Ohio Northern	1979	United States House of Representatives	

== Sports ==
Name	Chapter	Class	Notability	Ref.
Mike Bellotti	UC Davis	1970	college football coach, former athletic director, and ESPN analyst	
Jim Bouton	Western Michigan	1959	Major League pitcher and author of Ball Four	
Herb "Fritz" Crisler	Chicago		football coach and athletic director at the University of Chicago	
Sean Davis	Duke	2014	Major League Soccer player for the New York Red Bulls	
Mike Shanahan	Eastern Illinois	1971	Head coach of Washington Redskins	
Paul Splittorff	Morningside College	1968	Major League pitcher for the Kansas City Royals	
Kevin Streelman	Duke	2001	PGA golfer	
Jared Veldheer	Hillsdale College	2007	Offensive lineman for the Arizona Cardinals	
Brian White	Duke	2017	Major League Soccer player for the New York Red Bulls	
Steve Wilson	Kansas State	1999	Vice President and Director of Athletics, William Woods University	

== Other ==
Name	Chapter	Class	Notability	Ref.
Kenneth L. Hallenbeck	Michigan	1955	President of the American Numismatic Association	
Phil Plait	Michigan	1987	Astronomer	
