= Petals Network =

Floristry company

Petals Network is a florist delivery service company. Established in 1992, Petals offers both a florist-to-florist clearinghouse service and a customer to florist service through a network of independent local florists.

Petals has a network of over 1,600 florists in several countries; Australia, New Zealand and the UK. It also uses the services of other local floral relay services to operate in 70 other countries around the world. Petals is based in Armidale, New South Wales Australia.

In March 2011, Petals Network was acquired by their US-based competitor Teleflora Inc. for an undisclosed sum. This was Teleflora's first international acquisition and was believed to "strengthen the U.S.-based Teleflora's offerings throughout Australia and New Zealand". Together, Petals Network and Teleflora have a network of almost 40,000 affiliated florists worldwide.
