= Stewart Resnick =

American businessman

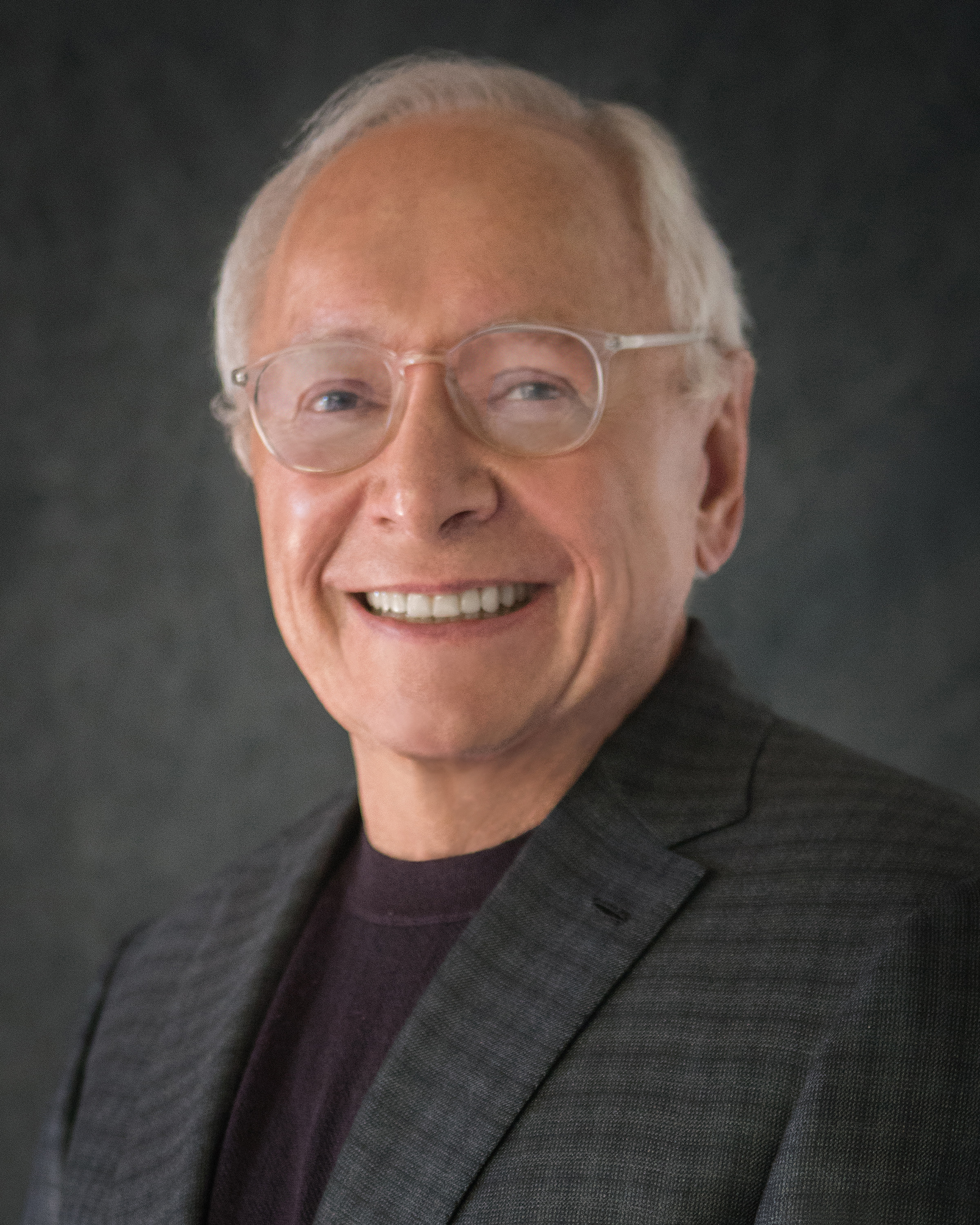
- Born: December 24, 1936 (age 89); New Jersey, US
- Education: University of California, Los Angeles (BA, JD)
- Occupations: Businessman and philanthropist
- Spouse(s): Sandra Frazin (divorced); Lynda Rae Harris (1972–present)
- Children: 5: 3 with Frazin, and 2 stepchildren with Harris
- Relatives: Jack H. Harris (father-in-law)

Stewart Allen Resnick (born December 24, 1936) is an American billionaire businessman and philanthropist. He is the president and chairman of The Wonderful Company, a privately held company he owns with his wife Lynda Resnick.

== Early life and education ==
Resnick was born in 1936, and raised in a middle-class Jewish family in New Jersey and later moved to California with his family in the 1950s. His grandfather had immigrated from Ukraine when his father was 3. In 1959, he graduated with a BS from the University of California, Los Angeles and then a JD from the UCLA School of Law. While in law school, he founded his first business, a janitorial services company, which he sold in 1969.

== Career and companies ==
With the money he made from his first company, Resnick bought The Franklin Mint, a subsidiary of Roll International Corporation, in 1986. Franklin Mint is known for making model cars, souvenir plates, figurines, and Civil War-inspired chess sets. Resnick was CEO and chairman of the Franklin Mint Company until its sale in 2006. Since 1979 Resnick has been president and chairman of The Wonderful Company, formerly known as Roll Global, which owns many businesses in Central California and beyond. Through this holding company he and his wife own the POM Wonderful and Fiji Water brands, Wonderful Halos, Wonderful Pistachios and Almonds, JUSTIN Wines, Landmark Wines, JNSQ Wines, Suterra Pest Control and the Teleflora floral wire service company. Resnick sat on the board of directors of LeapFrog Enterprises from 2002 to 2005.

== Personal life ==
He is divorced from his first wife, Sandra Frazin. Since 1972, he has been married to Lynda Rae Harris. He has three children from his first marriage; and two stepchildren from his marriage to Harris. They reside in Beverly Hills, California.

== Criticism ==
During the 2011–2017 California drought—also called the Great Drought—Resnick's Paramount Farms, which is part of the Wonderful Company, drilled twenty-one new wells in 2015 alone. Resnick is the wealthiest farmer in the United States, with a net worth exceeding nine billion dollars according to a 2020 article in Forbes magazine, and owns a majority stake in the Kern Water Bank, one of California's largest underground water storage facilities, which is capable of storing 500 billion gallons [1.9 billion m^{3}]. The Kern Water Bank, though privately owned, profits from water sales through publicly funded water transportation systems. The acquisition, continuing private ownership, and water sales profit from this taxpayer-developed resource infrastructure, while California suffers under drought, is controversial. Growing water-intensive nut tree crops in the Central Valley—a single almond can require up to 1.1 US gallons (4.2 L) of water—has drawn criticism during California's ongoing drought. According to Forbes magazine, the Wonderful Company uses "at least 120 billion gallons [450 million m^{3}] a year, two-thirds on nuts, enough to supply San Francisco's 852,000 residents for a decade".

In an effort to make their impact on the region more positive, the Resnicks have invested in the growth of the local economy and nutrition centers. As the New York Times notes, "in Lost Hills there are new health centers, new pre-K facilities, new housing projects, new gardens, new sidewalks and lights, a new community center and a new soccer field." They have partnered with the Central Valley Project and the State Water Project to bring water to Kern County, having spent $35 million in recent years buying up more water from nearby districts to replenish the Central Valley's supplies.

In 2015, it was revealed that the Resnicks and other farmers had been watering their orchards with treated fracking waste water. A water recycling program in California allows oil companies to sell wastewater to landowners, including farmers like the Wonderful Company. A 2025 political and environmental documentary directed by Yasha Levine and Rowan Wernha called Pistachio Wars purported to show how the owners allegedly gained influence over key elements of California’s public water system amid intensifying drought, as well as the environmental impact of large-scale agriculture, including the use of chemically tainted wastewater for irrigation. The documentary also features evidence that the Resnick family "donate to hawkish-on-Iran think tanks and lobbying groups, and Republican members of Congress from the San Joaquin Valley have been outspoken Iran critics." The documentary suggests that continued hostile relations with Iran have been to the benefit of the American pistachio industry.

== Philanthropy ==
In September 2008, Resnick and his wife announced a $45 million gift to the Los Angeles County Museum of Art for the construction of a new exhibition pavilion, as well as $10 million in artworks. In 2018, the Hammer Museum in Los Angeles announced the couple's $30 million gift to help pay for a renovation and expansion project.

In September 2019, Resnick and his wife pledged their largest donation to date, a $750 million endowment to California Institute of Technology for climate research. In 2022, the Resnicks pledged $50 million to the University of California, Davis to fund the Lynda and Stewart Resnick Center for Agricultural Innovation, which opened in May 2026.

Stewart Resnick also sits on the board of trustees as Bard College. In 2025 he made a $10 million donation to the school. Additionally on the Bard College Campus there is a gatehouse named in the Resnick family honor and a dormitory residential complex named after Stewart and Lynda Resnick.

In February 2026, Resnick and his wife donated $100 million to UCLA Health to fund the expansion of a neuropsychiatric hospital and mental health campus.
