= Flower delivery =

Service in floristry

Flower delivery is a service in floristry. In many cases it is conducted through websites which allow consumers to browse online catalogues of flowers. They are often delivered to a third party, the recipient of the gift. Historically, these were coordinated through telegraphs and later telephones before the advent of the World Wide Web.

== Floral wire service intermediaries ==
A floral wire service, also known as a flower relay service, is a company established primarily to facilitate order exchange and fulfillment between local florists and/or third-party sales agents of floral products. Floral wire services offer proprietary networks, clearing house services and operate as affiliate marketing sources.

=== History ===
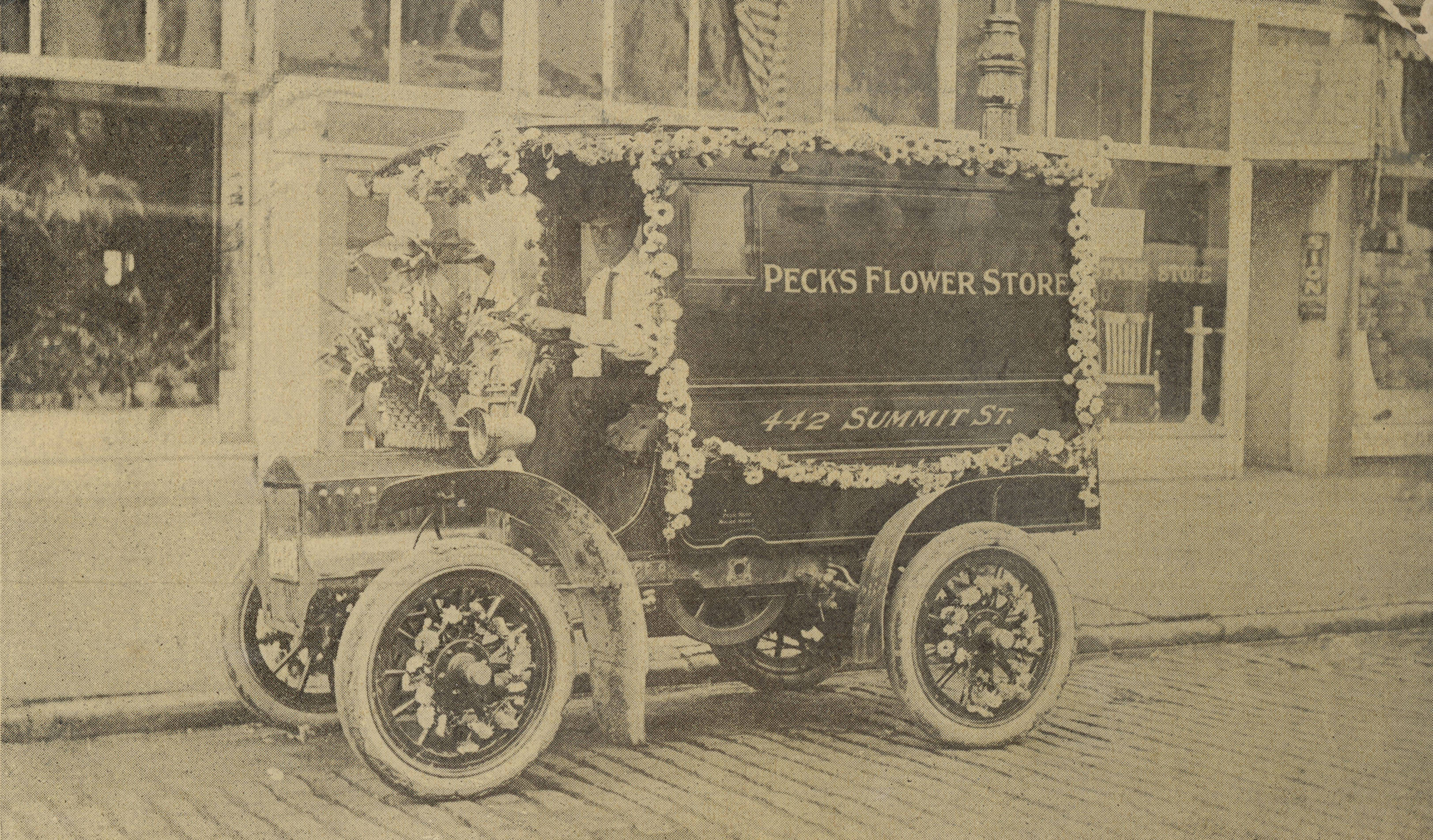
Peck's Flower Store Delivery Truck, Toledo, Ohio

The first floral wire service, established by a group of 15 US florists in 1910, was Florists' Telegraph Delivery Service (FTD). The group was formed as a cooperative and was mutually owned by its members. Members exchanged orders via telegraph messages and hence the name 'wire service' was used to identify the order exchange business model. In 1965, with the introduction of international order sending, FTD changed its name to Florists' Transworld Delivery.

In the 1920s, a group of British florists formed a similar 'Flowers by Wire' group. This group, also a business cooperative and affiliated with FTD, began operating under the name Interflora in 1953. By the 1970s, most European countries had their own Interflora units.

In addition to the cooperatives, independently owned and operated for-profit companies built their own proprietary networks including Teleflora and 1-800-Flowers with their BloomNet division.

=== Operations ===
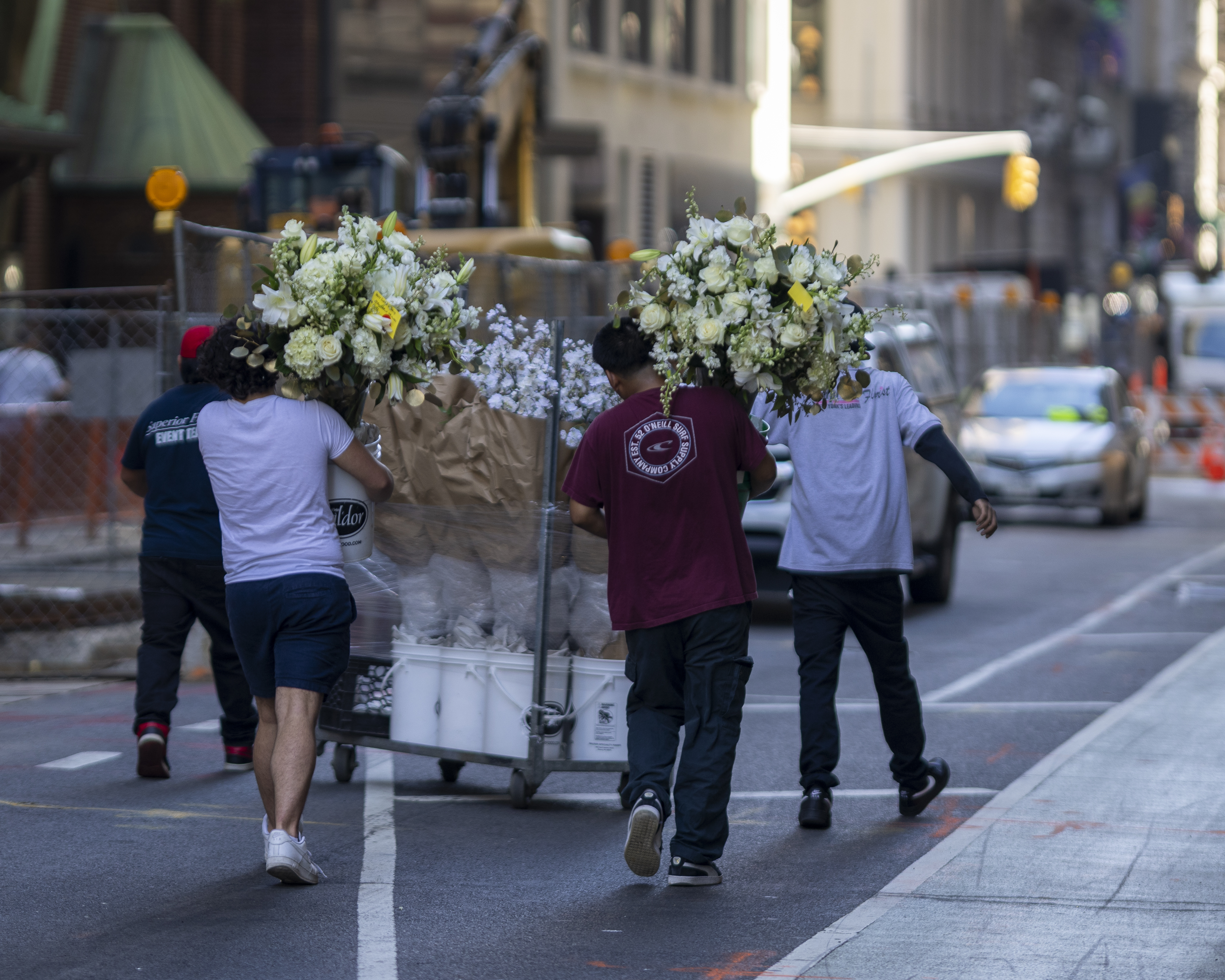
Florists push a rolling cart of floral arrangements down a street in New York City

Similar to travel agents, wire service affiliates' main functions are to act as agents and sell products and services on behalf of local florist suppliers. Unlike other retail businesses, sellers are not required to keep stock on hand. A flower arrangement or other floral gift is not purchased from a supplier unless a customer requests the item. The flowers or other floral gift are supplied to them at a discount. The profit is therefore the difference between the advertised price which the customer pays and the discounted price at which it is charged to the agent. This is known as the commission. A wire service affiliate selling agent typically earns 20% of the product and local delivery price, plus services charges. Additionally, many florist wire services pay performance rebates to affiliate resellers.

Twenty-four states in the USA have now outlawed geographic misrepresentation by floral product sellers in Yellow Pages and in online advertising.National floral marketplaces such as BloomNation offer an alternative to the wire services.

=== Florists' attitudes ===
Many traditional retail florists have a deep-rooted disdain for modern wire services. This comes from the perception that companies such as FTD, 1800flowers, From You Flowers and Teleflora take floral orders away from the local business and extract excessive commission.

FTD was formerly a co-op, owned by its member florists. In 1994 the board of directors made the decision to sell the co-op to Perry Capital. The revenue from the sale was disbursed amongst the member florists, more senior florists being paid substantially more than the more junior florists. At this point FTD became a for-profit company.

== Cooperative efforts ==
Wire services were originally member-owned co-ops, but were privatized. Florists have organized new nonprofit initiatives through a group called Florists for Change with a website RealLocalFlorists.com.

== Types of service ==
Services are broadly divided into four categories:

=== Local florist ===
Local florist websites offer arrangements and bouquets for direct delivery in the geographic area physically serviced by their companies' own vans and personnel. This service is also known as "hand delivered" and has the advantage of presenting shoppers with the precise items available for delivery on a same-day basis. Local delivery charges are generally displayed as a separate fee from the price of each product.

=== Order broker ===
Order brokers are third-party agents that display arrangement and bouquet product images and then transfer orders to affiliated local florists for fulfillment and hand delivery. Order broker customers pay additional service fees as well as local delivery charges, which are generally included in the price displayed with each product. Orders are sent to local florists for fulfillment via a floral wire service. The advantage of this service is the consolidation of purchases for delivery to multiple locations through a single website. The disadvantage is the customer cannot see or pick the fulfilling florist.

Most florists also offer order brokering services for national and international delivery.

=== Relay florist ===
A relay service, often referred to as a relay florist, is a website where a person or organization procures a purchase order between a consumer and itself instead of the order being placed directly with a local florist in the delivery area. The relay service collects payment for the order; however, as the relay service normally cannot fulfill the order itself unless the delivery is local to the location of the relay service, it relays the order and payment to a local florist in the delivery area, minus a commission.

=== Courier delivery ===
Courier-delivered flowers (also sometimes called grower-direct or Flowers By Post) are assembled into bunches at the farm or in the warehouse of an importer or distributor; they are then placed in cardboard boxes and shipped direct to the recipient via overnight couriers. The advantage of such a service is that because the flowers are shipped from the farm or importer they can be fresher although temperature fluctuations en route and shipping conditions may negate the benefit. Recipients are responsible to unpack, clean, condition and arrange courier-delivered flowers.

Few companies in fact ship flowers direct to the consumer from the farm. Most online flower retails such as ProFlowers, Interflora, Teleflora, FTD typically function as order gatherers and will work with local florists to have the order delivered.

== See also ==
- FloristWare POS System
- Cut flowers
- Dutch flower bucket
