= Untied (album) =

Studio album by The Ten Tenors
- Released: 2000
- Studio: Grey Ghost Studios, Brisbane, Rocking Horse, Byron Bay, Australia.
- Genre: Chanson
- Length: 44:24
- Label: Ocean Music, Koch Classics

The Ten Tenors chronology
Colours (1999)	Untied (2000)	A Not So Silent Night (2001)

Alternative cover
- German edition

Untied is the third studio album from Australian vocal group The Ten Tenors, released in Australia in 2000. The album was released in Europe in 2002 under the title One Is Not Enough.

== Track listing ==
No.	Title	Writer(s)	Length
1.	"Rocket"	Kirsty Ahern / Kim Kirkman	4:03
2.	"What am I Waiting For?"	David Kidd	3:05
3.	"Bohemian Rhapsody"	Freddie Mercury	5:58
4.	"Darlinghurst Road"	Matthew Hickey	2:54
5.	"My Daughter"	Andrew Pryor	3:08
6.	"Because of You"	Matthew Hickey	3:38
7.	"Throw Your Arms Around Me"	Mark Seymour	2:58
8.	"Where Do I Go?"	Kim Kirkman	4:08
9.	"Never (Just a Memory)"	David Kidd	3:19
10.	"Dancing Queen"	Benny Andersson / Björn Ulvaeus	2:34
11.	"Australian Medley" (Down Under/Tie Me Kangaroo Down/True Blue/Pub With No Beer/Waltzing Matilda)	Marie Cowan / Rolf Harris / Colin Hay / Gordon Parsons / Ron Strykert / John Williamson	8:25
12.	"That's Amore" (European bonus track)	Jack Brooks, Harry Warren	2:42
13.	"Italian Medley" (Mattinata/Santa Lucia/Volare (Nel blu dipinto di blu)(European bonus track))	Ruggero Leoncavallo / Guillaume Louis Cottrau / Franco Migliacci / Domenico Modugno	7:21
14.	"Rawhide" (German bonus track)	Ned Washington / Dimitri Tiomkin	2:54
15.	"'O sole mio" (German bonus track)	Eduardo di Capua, Giovanni Capurro	1:56

- European bonus tracks recorded in Berlin on 30/31 August 2002.

== Charts ==
Chart (2002/03)	Peak position
German Albums (Offizielle Top 100)	72
Dutch Albums (Album Top 100)	18

== Release history ==
Region	Date	Label	Format	Catalogue number
Australia	2000	Ocean Music Group	CD	OC111
Europe	15 February 2002	Koch Classics / Warner Music International	CD	B00005Y4G7
Germany	7 October 2002	Koch Classics / Warner Music International	CD	066 237-2
