= QVC Group =

American fashion holding company

- Formerly: Liberty Interactive Corporation (2011–2018); Qurate Retail Group (2018–2025)
- Type: Public
- Traded as: Nasdaq: QVCGA (Series A); Nasdaq: QVCGB (Series B)
- ISIN: US74915M1009; US74915M2098
- Industry: Media holding company
- Predecessor: Liberty Media
- Founded: 1991; 35 years ago
- Headquarters: Englewood, Colorado, U.S
- Key people: Greg Maffei (chairman); David Rawlinson II (president and CEO)
- Revenue: ▼US$10.9 billion (2023)
- Operating income: ▲US$590 million (2023)
- Net income: ▲US$−145 million (2023)
- Total assets: ▼US$11.4 billion (2023)
- Total equity: ▼US$385 million (2023)
- Owner: John C. Malone (6.7%)
- Number of employees: c. 20,300 (2023)
- Divisions: List of divisions
- Website: qvcgrp.com

QVC Group (formerly Qurate Retail, Inc., also known as Qurate Retail Group), is an American media conglomerate controlled by company chairman John C. Malone, who owns a majority of the voting shares.

== History ==
=== 1998 launch by Liberty Media ===
Liberty Interactive logo

Originally a division of Liberty Media, Liberty Interactive was spun-off by Liberty Media on September 28, 1998, to form its own entity entitled. The division was formed with the purpose of taking advantage of emerging technologies, such as set-top boxes, to develop interactive programming. The company initially owned 86% of TCI Music Inc. (NASDAQ symbol: TUNE/TUNEP). As of January 1999, E! President and Chief Executive Officer Lee Masters became the new company's CEO, and Bruce Ravenel became the chief technology officer.

On September 10, 1999, TCI Music was renamed Liberty Digital Inc. (NASDAQ symbol: LDIG), with the new company trading on NASDAQ's National Market tier, after Liberty Media traded most of its internet content, interactive television assets, and rights to provide AT&T's cable systems with interactive services, plus cash and notes valued at $150 million, for TCI Music stock. Masters, who became Liberty Digital's CEO, told The Wall Street Journal that the new company had a value of $1 billion, $650 million of that from the interactive unit of Liberty Media, which had also used the name Liberty Digital. Liberty Digital lost $244 million with revenue of $66 million in 1999, thanks to investments in struggling Internet businesses HomeGrocer, drugstore.com, TiVo Corporation, and iVillage. The company bought half of the Game Show Network because of its interactive features.

On December 17, 1999, TCI Satellite Entertainment Inc. (TSAT), based in Englewood, Colorado, announced that Liberty Media was trading its interest in Sprint PCS for $300 million in TCI Satellite preferred stock. A new company, ninety percent owned by Liberty Media and ten percent owned by TCI Satellite, would combine the satellite-related businesses and take advantage of the growing area of Internet content.

=== Spin-offs ===
In 2004, IAC/Interactive announced the spin-off of its travel site Expedia into the new company Expedia. Barry Diller remained the head of IAC/Interactive and the chairman of Expedia, a move that was completed in 2005.

In November 2007, Liberty Media announced four major spin-offs: HSN, Ticketmaster, Interval (vacation and time-share business) and LendingTree. All spun off companies became publicly traded. IAC retained most of its emerging internet businesses: Ask.com, Evite, Match.com, Vimeo, Citysearch and Zwinky. All spun off units remained headed by Barry Diller.

In 2010, Liberty Media announced that it would spin off Liberty Starz and Liberty Capital into separate entities.

In October 2014, Liberty Interactive spun off BuySeasons and its stake in TripAdvisor into a new company, Liberty TripAdvisor Holdings.

In 2016, Liberty Interactive announced that it completed spin off of CommerceHub as a separate company and its interests in Expedia and Bodybuilding.com into a new company, Liberty Expedia Holdings.

=== 2010s sales and acquisitions ===
Qurate Retail logo used until February 21, 2025

In July 2014, Liberty Interactive announced it would be selling Provide Commerce (parent of ProFlowers) to FTD in return for an equity stake in FTD.

In October 2014, Liberty Interactive announced its board had approved the division of the firm into two trading stocks – one for its shopping business, QVC Group, and another for its digital commerce, Liberty Digital Commerce, which would trade as Liberty Ventures Group.

In April 2017, Liberty Interactive announced it would acquire Alaskan cable company GCI. On July 6, 2017, Liberty Interactive announced that it would purchase the remaining 62% of HSN stock that it didn't already own, in a $2.1 billion all-stock deal at $40.36 a share.

In July 2017, Liberty Interactive announced that later that year it would spin off its "cable holdings and other non-retail assets" into the new company Liberty Ventures, with Liberty Interactive to be renamed QVC Group. QVC Group would consist of QVC, HSN, Cornerstone Brands, and Zulily.

On March 1, 2018, Liberty Interactive Corporation announced that it would rename itself to Qurate Retail Group.

=== 2020s ===
In July 2021, Qurate Retail announced that former president and CEO Mike George would be replaced by David Rawlinson II on October 1 of the same year.

In May 2023, Qurate Retail Group's stock was facing a delisting from the Nasdaq if share prices are unable to rebound, as their stock has declined over 80% over the past year. To avoid delisting, Qurate Retail announced the sale of Zulily to Regent, L.P. In October 2023, CreditRiskMonitor reported that Qurate Retail Group was nearing a potential Chapter 11 bankruptcy filing. On February 21, 2025, Qurate Retail Group officially changed its name to QVC Group.

On April 15, 2026, QVC Group warned that it was preparing to file for Chapter 11 bankruptcy as soon as the end of that day, citing steadily viewer declines and debt burdens. QVC Group plans to enter a prepackaged restructuring support agreement with its creditors and exit Chapter 11 bankruptcy within no later than 90 days, or by around July 2026. On April 16, QVC Group filed for Chapter 11 bankruptcy protection in the United States District Court for the Southern District of Texas with plans to reduce over $5 billion in long-term debt, which will allow for the company to continue operating while having over $1 billion in debt remaining.

== Activities ==
- QVC Group: QVC, Inc., HSN, Cornerstone Brands
- Interests in: Brit + Co, FTD, giggle, ILG, Liberty Broadband, LendingTree, Quid

== See also ==
- List of Colorado companies
