= A Not So Silent Night =

Studio album by The Ten Tenors
- Released: November 19, 2001
- Genre: Christmas music
- Labels: Universal Music Australia, Warner Bros. Records

The Ten Tenors chronology
Untied (2000)	A Not So Silent Night (2001)	Larger than Life (2004)

Alternative cover
- American/European edition

A Not So Silent Night is the fourth studio and first Christmas album from Australian vocal group The Ten Tenors, released in November 2001. The album peaked at number 94 on the ARIA Charts in December 2001, becoming the group's first album to chart within the Australian top 100.

== Track listing ==
No.	Title	Length
1.	"Thousand Candles"	4:12
2.	"Child in a Manger"	3:10
3.	"Little Drummer Boy"	3:09
4.	"Veni, veni Emmanuel"	3:55
5.	"Oh Come All Ye Faithful"	2:48
6.	"God Rest Ye Merry Gentlemen"	2:52
7.	"Oh Holy Night"	3:54
8.	"Mary's Boy Child"	1:43
9.	"Santa Claus is Coming to Town"	1:53
10.	"Have Yourself a Merry Little Christmas"	3:04
11.	"O, Tannenbaum"	3:03
12.	"He'll Always Be There"	3:08
13.	"Christmas in Cairns"	3:46
14.	"Cold Lunch"	3:02
15.	"O Little Town of Bethlehem"	3:55
16.	"Silent Night"	3:23
17.	"Let It Snow!"	1:44

== Charts ==
Chart (2001)	Peak position
Australia (ARIA)	94
Australian Artist (ARIA)	17

== Release history ==
Region	Date	Label	Format	Catalogue number
Australia	19 November 2001	Universal Music Australia	CD	12232
United States / Europe	November 2008	Warner Music International	CD	505101115822
