= Our Christmas Wish =

Studio album by The Ten Tenors
- Released: November 13, 2015
- Genre: Christmas music
- Length: 52:41
- Language: English
- Label: MGM Records

The Ten Tenors chronology
On Broadway (Vol. 1) (2014)	Our Christmas Wish (2015)	In Mezzo al Mare (2016)

Our Christmas Wish is a Christmas and tenth studio album from Australian vocal group The Ten Tenors, released in November 2015. The album peaked at number 16 on the ARIA Charts in December 2015.

Proceeds from the sale of the album went towards to the Children’s Hospital Foundation.

== Track listing ==
No.	Title	Writer(s)	Length
1.	"The Little Drummer Boy"	Harry Simeone, Katherine Kennicott Davis, Henry Onorati	3:20
2.	"Adeste Fideles"		4:02
3.	"Winter Wonderland"	Richard B. Smith, Felix Bernard	3:19
4.	"White Christmas"	Irving Berlin	3:31
5.	"Joy to the World"	Isaac Watts	2:32
6.	"O Holy Night"	Placide Cappeau	4:16
7.	"Sleigh Ride"	Leroy Anderson	3:24
8.	"Amazing Grace"	John Newton	3:43
9.	"Thousand Candles"		4:26
10.	"All I Want for Christmas"	Mariah Carey, Walter Afanasieff	3:46
11.	"The Christmas Song"	Robert Wells, Mel Tormé	3:48
12.	"Veni, veni Emmanuel"		3:53
13.	"Feliz Navidad"	José Feliciano	3:58
14.	"Happy Xmas (War Is Over)"	John Lennon, Yoko Ono	4:51
Total length:			52:41

== Charts ==
Chart (2015–17)	Peak position
Australian Albums (ARIA)	16

=== Year-end charts ===
Year	Chart	Position
2015	Australian ARIA Charts	91
2015	Australian Artist ARIA Charts	32

== Release history ==
Region	Date	Label	Format	Catalogue number
Australia	13 November 2015	MGM Records	CD	FIASAU00011
