= Florists' Transworld Delivery =

American Flower Delivery Corporation

FTD LLC
- Type: Private
- Industry: Floral industry
- Founded: 1910; 116 years ago
- Headquarters: Downers Grove, Illinois, U.S.
- Key people: Michael Chapin
- Owner: Nexus Capital Management
- Subsidiaries: Florists' Transworld Delivery; ProFlowers
- Website: www.ftdcompanies.com; www.ftd.com

FTD LLC also known as Florists' Transworld Delivery, is a floral wire service, retailer, and wholesaler based in Downers Grove, Illinois, in the United States. FTD was founded as Florists' Telegraph Delivery in 1910, to help customers send flowers remotely on the same day by using florists in the FTD network who are near the intended recipient. It was based in Detroit, Michigan, and then moved to Southfield, Michigan, prior to its move to Downers Grove. It originated as a retailers' cooperative and began a process of demutualization in 1994. It operates two main businesses: The Consumer Business sells flowers and gift items through its websites and The Floral Business sells computer services, software and even fresh cut flowers to FTD and Interflora affiliated florists.

Retail Florist Association (formerly Extra Touch Florist Association and FTD Association) is a trade association that originated as the member education, advocacy and quality assurance arm of FTD, breaking formal ties with FTD in 2001.

FTD processes orders through the Mercury Network, its international telecommunications service.

== History ==
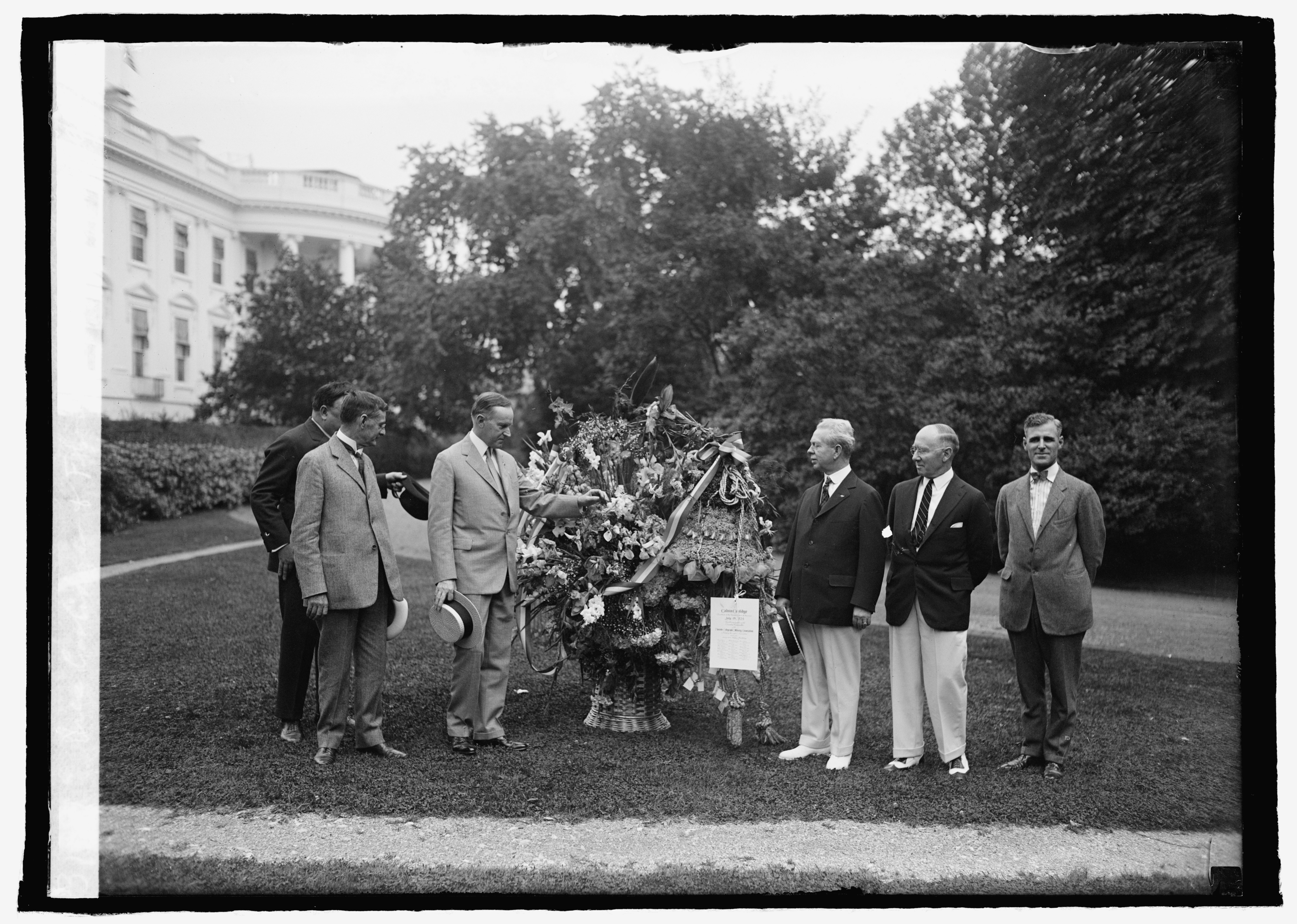
President Calvin Coolidge with representatives from the Florists' Telegraph Service in 1924.

On August 18, 1910, at the Seneca Hotel in Rochester, New York at a Retail Delivery Association meeting, thirteen American florists led by John Valentine, a Denver lawyer and floral company owner agreed to serve each other's out-of-town customers by exchanging orders via telegraph. This group was called Florists' Telegraph Delivery. In 1914, the company adapted Mercury by sixteenth-century Flemish sculptor Giambologna for its Mercury Man corporate logo, to emphasize the speed of delivery. In 1965, it began offering international orders, and took the name of Florists' Transworld Delivery.

=== Going public ===
In 1994, FTD began a process of demutualization, acquiring control of the business, and ownership of its assets.

On December 19, 1994, a precursor to the FTD Corporation, a private, for-profit company Perry Capital, acquired FTD, which then divided FTD into two organizations: FTD Incorporated, a for profit corporation, and FTD Association, a non-profit trade association.

FTD Incorporated retained FTD's businesses, including the Mercury Network and the clearinghouse, and controlled FTD Association's rules, regulations, and bylaws. The FTD Association retained member education, advocacy and quality assurance.

In 2000, FTD Incorporated held an initial public offering of FTD.com on the NASDAQ. FTD Group was listed on the NYSE in 2005. The company is based in Downers Grove, Illinois.

In 2001, the FTD Association separated from FTD Incorporated, terminated all contracts, and, in exchange for $14 million, renamed itself Extra Touch Floral Association, and later, Retail Florist Association. It is based in Livonia, Michigan.

In 2008, United Online (Nasdaq: UNTD) announced a merger agreement with FTD Group, valued at $800 million. The acquisition was completed and shares of FTD ceased to trade on the NYSE August 26, 2008.

In 2013, FTD is spun off from United Online resulting in FTD Companies, Inc. becoming an independent, publicly traded company listed on NASDAQ.

In July 2019, FTD's North American and Latin America consumer and florist businesses were purchased by Nexus Capital Management and thusly have become a privately owned company and no longer will be a publicly traded company.

In May 2023, FTD merged with From You Flowers, LLC. Michael Chapin, founder and CEO of From You Flowers, took over as CEO of the combined companies. From You Flowers, LLC does not have any retail locations and depend on florists within wire service networks to complete their orders. At the time of the merger From You Flowers, LLC held a 1 star rating across many platforms.

=== Acquisitions ===
In 1994, FTD was acquired by Perry Capital Corporation from the florists and converted into a for-profit corporation.

On July 31, 2006, FTD, Inc. announced its acquisition of Interflora Holdings, a UK-based sister co-operative that offered the FTD network in Britain and Ireland under the Interflora brand. "The acquisition, first announced on July 7th, 2006, was made for a purchase price of GBP 66 million, or approximately [US]$122 million, excluding transaction costs."

In 2012, Interflora acquired Flying Flowers, Flowers Direct and Drake Algar in the U.K.

In July 2019, FTD's North American and Latin America consumer and florist businesses were purchased by Nexus Capital Management and are now known as FTD LLC.

In May 2023, FTD merged with From You Flowers, LLC. Michael Chapin, founder and CEO of From You Flowers, took over as CEO of the combined companies.

== Operations ==
Fiscal year 2006 revenues grew 6.2% to $465.1 million, compared with revenues of $437.8 million for fiscal 2005. This revenue growth was driven by an 11.6% increase in revenue in the Consumer Segment.

The Mercury Network, the electronic network used by FTD, processes about fifteen million orders annually, through about 50,000 FTD affiliates in 154 countries, of which about 20,000 are in the United States and Canada.

On July 19, 2018, it was announced that CEO John Walden would be stepping down as the company began restructuring. Scott Levin took over as president and CEO.

In June 2019 FTD filed for Chapter 11 bankruptcy protection while it restructures; all customer deliveries will continue in the meantime. The company said it has a tentative deal to sell its flower delivery business in North and South America to Nexus Capital. It has also received offers to buy two subsidiaries: Personal Creations and the candy delivery business Shari's Berries. Shari's Berries was acquired in 2019 by 1-800-Flowers.com.

In July 2019, the foregoing transactions were consummated for FTD's floral consumer businesses and FTD Companies became FTD LLC. with the purchase of FTD and ProFlowers by Nexus Capital Management.

In March 2020, Charlie Cole was named CEO.

== Lawsuits ==
FTD had obtained a near-monopoly position in its market. It has been sued several times by the United States Department of Justice to ensure it does not engage in non-competitive behavior, namely prohibiting members from affiliating with competing flowers-by-wire services. FTD entered into consent decrees with the Department of Justice after 1956, 1969, and 1990 suits. Florists' Transworld Delivery (FTD), sued its competitor ProFlowers for false advertising in August 2005. The suit focused on ProFlowers' claim to ship "direct from the fields" with "no middlemen". Stating that the lawsuit was "without merit", ProFlowers brought counterclaims against FTD. The lawsuit was settled a year later out of court.

== See also ==
- Floral industry
