= Nostalgica =

Studio album by The Ten Tenors
- Released: August 15, 2008
- Studio: Barrandov Studios, Prague, Czech Republic
- Genre: Pop rock; classical; pop; vocal
- Length: 46:16
- Language: English, Spanish
- Label: Rhino Records, Warner Bros. Records
- Producer: Simon Franglen

The Ten Tenors chronology
Here's to the Heroes (2006)	Nostalgica (2008)	Amigos Para Siempre (2009)

Nostalgica is the seventh studio album from Australian vocal group The Ten Tenors, released in August 2008.

== Reception ==
Matt Collar from AllMusic gave the album 3.5 out of 5 saying; "The Australian classical crossover ensemble celebrated their tenth anniversary with a collection of songs most frequently requested by their fans. Though they are known for covering more contemporary pop and rock songs by such bands as Queen and AC/DC, based on the songs included on Nostalgica, the Ten Tenors' fans prefer their more standards-oriented material."

== Track listing ==
Standard Edition
No.	Title	Writer(s)	Length
1.	"Mona Lisa"	Ray Evans, Jay Livingston	3:51
2.	"Bésame Mucho"	Consuelo Velázquez	3:23
3.	"What a Wonderful World"	Bob Thiele, George David Weiss	4:13
4.	"Danny Boy"	Frederic Weatherly	4:13
5.	"Moon River"	Johnny Mercer, Henry Mancini	3:59
6.	"Cheek to Cheek"	Irving Berlin	4:08
7.	"Over the Rainbow"	Harold Arlen, E.Y. Harburg	3:11
8.	"As Time Goes By"	Herman Hupfeld	4:07
9.	"Granada"	Agustín Lara	4:00
10.	"Night and Day"	Cole Porter	3:42
11.	"You'll Never Walk Alone"	Rodgers and Hammerstein	3:33
12.	"Swinging on a Star"	Johnny Burke, Jimmy Van Heusen	3:37
Total length:			46:16

== Charts ==
=== Weekly charts ===
Chart (2008–09)	Peak position
Australian Albums (ARIA)	27
German Albums (Offizielle Top 100)	61

=== Year-end charts ===
Chart (2008)	Position
Australian Classical Albums (ARIA)	8
