= On Broadway (Vol. 1) =

Studio album by The Ten Tenors
- Released: May 16, 2014
- Genre: Pop rock; classical; pop; vocal
- Length: 38:40
- Language: English
- Label: Frog In A Sock, Warner Music Australia

The Ten Tenors chronology
Double Platinum (2011)	On Broadway (Vol. 1) (2014)	Our Christmas Wish (2015)

On Broadway (Vol. 1) is the ninth studio album from Australian vocal group The Ten Tenors, released in May 2014. The album peaked at number 44 on the ARIA Charts.

The Ten Tenors promoted the album with an Australian tour across June and July 2014.

== Track listing ==
No.	Title	Writer(s)	Length
1.	"The Impossible Dream"	Mitch Leigh, Joe Darion	3:36
2.	"Oh, What a Beautiful Mornin'"	Rodgers and Hammerstein	2:49
3.	"Theme from New York, New York"	Fred Ebb, John Kander	3:14
4.	"Over the Rainbow"	Harold Arlen, E.Y. Harburg	3:14
5.	"Falling Slowly"	Glen Hansard, Markéta Irglová	4:11
6.	"Cheek to Cheek"	Irving Berlin	4:11
7.	"Bring Him Home"	Alain Boublil, Claude-Michel Schönberg, Herbert Kretzmer	3:45
8.	"Music of the Night"	Andrew Lloyd Webber, Charles Hart	5:44
9.	"Somebody to Love"	Freddie Mercury	3:57
10.	"I Still Call Australia Home"	Peter Allen	3:59
Total length:			38:40

== Charts ==
Chart (2014)	Peak position
Australian Albums (ARIA)	44

== Release history ==
Region	Date	Label	Format	Catalogue number
Australia	16 May 2014	Frog In A Sock, Warner Music Australia	CD, digital download	5419621452
