= Lynda Resnick =

American billionaire businesswoman (born 1943)

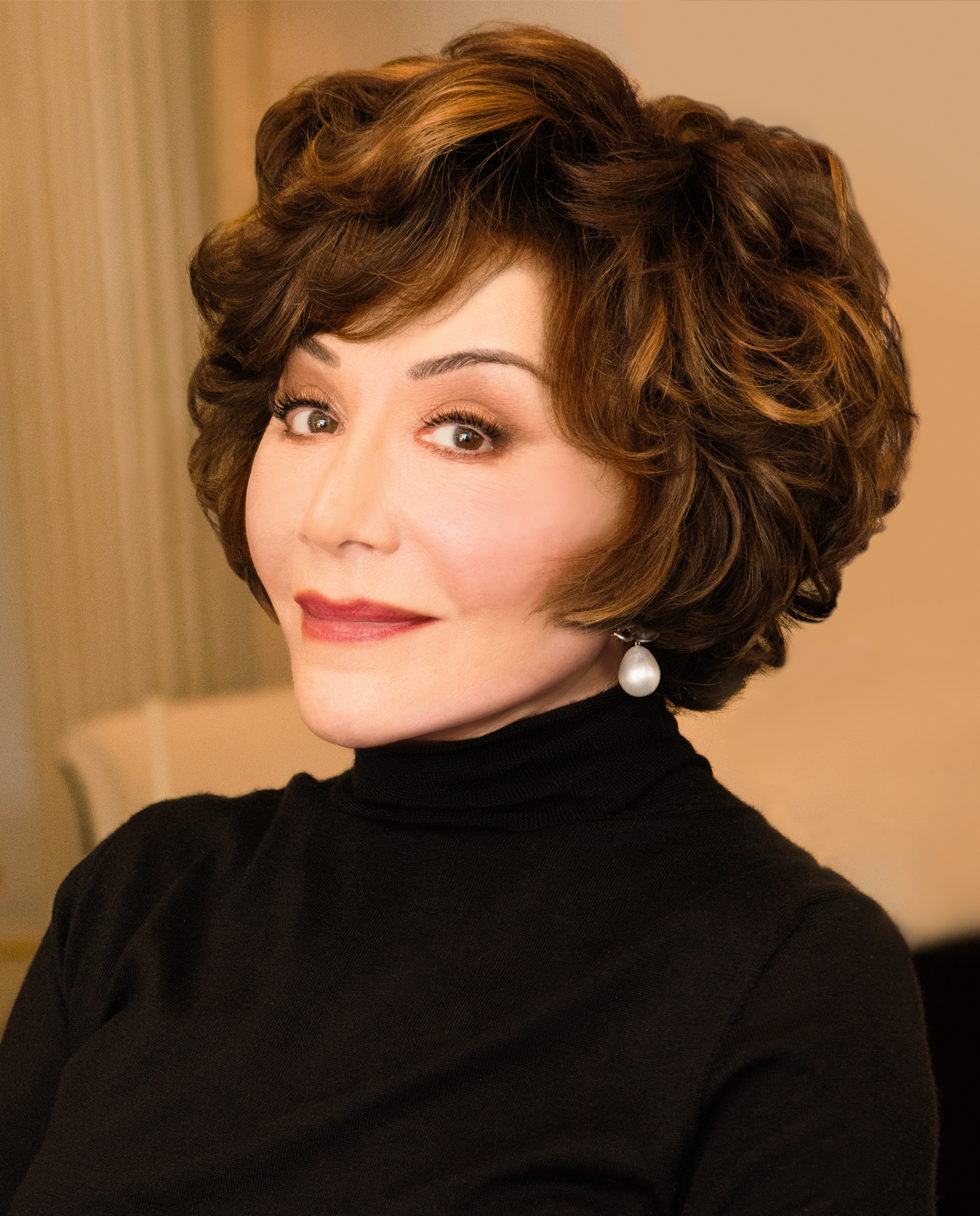
- Resnick in 2015
- Born: Lynda Rae Harris; 1943 (age 82–83); Baltimore, Maryland, U.S.
- Occupations: Entrepreneur, Philanthropist
- Spouse(s): Hershel Sinay; Stewart Resnick (m. 1972)
- Children: 2 sons
- Father: Jack H. Harris
- Website: www.wonderful.com/lyndaresnick/

Lynda Rae Resnick (née Harris) is an American entrepreneur born in 1943. She is vice-chairman of The Wonderful Company.

== Early life and education ==
Lynda Resnick was born Lynda Rae Harris to a Jewish family in Baltimore, Maryland and raised in Philadelphia, Pennsylvania. Her father, Jack H. Harris, worked as a film distributor during the 1950s; he is known for producing The Blob. Her mother, Muriel was an interior designer. At the age of four, Resnik had a recurring role on The Horn & Hardart Children's Hour broadcast from WCAU-TV. The family moved to Southern California when she was 15. After briefly attending Santa Monica College, Resnick took a job at the in-house ad agency for Sunset House catalog before founding an advertising agency, in 1961 at the age of 19.

== Career ==
Resnick started an advertising agency in 1961, which eventually grew to about a dozen employees. She met Stewart Resnick, whom she eventually married, through this business. In 1979, the Resnicks purchased Teleflora, where Resnick directed marketing policy and served as president. She won a Gold Effie Award for a campaign that paired fresh flowers with a collectible keepsake container, a format that later became common in the floral delivery industry.

Resnick also directed marketing for The Wonderful Company, which increased its market share of pistachios following the ‘Get Crackin’’ marketing campaign. In 2010, Resnick wrote a book on her approach to marketing called Rubies in the Orchard.

=== Pentagon Papers ===
Resnick was involved in the antiwar movement during the Vietnam War era. In 1969, Resnick was dating Anthony J. Russo, an engineer at the Rand Corp. She became close to Russo’s friend, Daniel Ellsberg, and helped copy the Pentagon Papers using the Xerox machine in her ad agency. This document was later made public by The New York Times in 1971. The documents detailed aspects of the war hidden from the public and damaged the credibility of the presidents involved. Resnick was designated an unindicted co-conspirator, and says that during that time she was regularly followed by the FBI, briefly jailed and physically threatened. According to Resnick, this led to post traumatic stress disorder. Legal actions were eventually dropped. Ellsberg and Resnick remained close throughout their lives, and Resnick spoke at Ellsberg’s memorial service in 2023.

== Philanthropy ==
Lynda Resnick, along with her husband Stewart, have been listed among the nation’s top philanthropists according to Forbes and the Chronicle of Philanthropy. The Resnicks have given $2.5 billion to causes primarily focused on communities where their employees live and work, such as California’s Central Valley, as well as efforts to combat global climate change. The New York Times recognized Lynda Resnick as “the driving force behind the couple’s charitable efforts.” Their community investments include funding for education, healthcare, affordable housing and infrastructure.

The Resnicks founded and continue to support Wonderful College Prep Academy, two public charter schools in Lost Hills and Delano, California. These schools serve 2,400 TK-12 students. Roughly 70% of students go on to college, many the first in their families to do so.

The Resnicks' Wonderful Company also sponsors dual enrollment programs at Ag Prep. This offers students at seven high schools in the Central Valley on-the-job training for careers in areas including agriculture, education and healthcare.

The Resnicks support research related to global climate change. The Resnicks $750 million 2019 pledge to the California Institute of Technology (Caltech) was at the time the largest ever for research into environmental sustainability and the second-largest gift to a U.S. academic institution. They have given $100 million to other universities as well. In 2022, the Resnicks pledged $50 million to the University of California, Davis to fund the Lynda and Stewart Resnick Center for Agricultural Innovation, which opened in May 2026.

They directed $10 million to relief efforts amid the 2025 Los Angeles fires. At the University of California, Los Angeles, the Resnicks and their foundation support a Food Law and Policy Center, and the Stewart and Lynda Resnick Neuropsychiatric Hospital. In February 2026, Resnick and her husband donated $100 million to UCLA Health to fund the expansion of the neuropsychiatric hospital and mental health campus. Other donations include $70 million to the Los Angeles County Museum of Art and a $30 million gift to the Hammer Museum to build a new cultural center.

In California’s wine country, the Resnicks supported the construction of the JUSTIN and J. LOHR Center for Wine and Viticulture at California Polytechnic State University, San Luis Obispo. In 2024, the university announced that the Resnicks are funding a new center on campus to support first-generation college students.

In Fiji, the Resnick owned FIJI Water, through its foundation, funds local infrastructure, community health centers, classrooms, teacher housing, bus shelters, student walking paths and disaster recovery efforts.

As an Aspen Institute trustee, Resnick and her company sponsor the annual Aspen Action Forum, a global convening of leaders from business, government and non-profits. They also funded the Center for Herbert Bayer Studies on the institute’s campus, creating the first permanent museum for the Bauhaus artist.

Fortune also cited the Resnick-led philanthropy in naming the company to its list of the “100 Best Places to Work” in 2024 and 2025.

== Board Memberships ==
Lynda Resnick is a trustee at the Aspen Institute, the Milken Family Foundation, and the Los Angeles Museum of Modern Art, and a trustee emeritus at the Philadelphia Museum of Art.

== Personal life ==
Resnick has been married twice. Her first marriage to publisher Hershel Sinay ended in divorce in 1969. In 1972, Resnick married Stewart Resnick, who is also her business partner. She has two children and three stepchildren.

== Criticisms ==
=== Water ===
Growing water-intensive nut tree crops (a single almond requires 1.1 US gallons [4.2 L] of water) in the Central Valley drew criticism during the 2011–17 California drought. According to Forbes, Wonderful Company uses "at least 120 billion gallons [450 million m^{3}] a year, two-thirds on nuts, enough to supply San Francisco's 852,000 residents for a decade." In addition, the Resnicks own a majority stake in the Kern Water Bank, "one of California's largest underground water storage facilities. It is capable of storing 500 billion gallons [1.9 billion m^{3}] of water. They have also partnered with the Central Valley Project and the State Water Project to bring water to Kern County, spending $35 million in recent years to buy up more water from nearby districts to replenish the Central Valley's supplies.

At the same time as exporting almonds to Asia and other locations, they import Fiji bottled water from the South Pacific. Some foreign conservationists criticize the Resnicks for "hogging the archipelago's precious water supply... while island natives didn't always have water to drink themselves, due to crumbling and insufficient infrastructure." However, local officials support the investment Fiji water makes in the economy as "a critical contributor to the Fijian economy... and a gift to the Fijian tourism industry."

=== POM pomegranate drink ===
In addition, their claims for the POM pomegranate drink have been contested. According to Forbes, "The Federal Trade Commission filed a complaint in 2010 that the Resnicks' POM Wonderful had used deceptive advertising when marketing the antioxidant-rich drink as being able to treat, prevent or reduce the risk of heart disease, prostate cancer and erectile dysfunction. In 2012 a federal judge agreed that some of the ads were misleading. In 2013 FTC commissioners denied the Resnicks' appeal. In October 2015, the Resnicks asked the Supreme Court to take the case." In May 2016 the Supreme Court declined to take the case.
