= Untied.com =

- Website type: Legal
- Owner: Jeremy Cooperstock
- Website: untied.com (archived)
- Commercial: Yes
- Registration: No
- Launched: 1997
- Current status: Defunct

Untied.com was a website critical of United Airlines that logged complaints from passengers. The name untied.com transposes two of the letters of the name "United" and also suggests disorder. Kevin Simpson of the Denver Post said in 2000 that "The Untied.com phenomenon mirrors the online trend in consumer activism that has caught on with the disgruntled flying public this summer travel season." In 1998 Laura Bly of the Los Angeles Times said that Untied.com was "One of the most visible efforts to chastise a travel company in cyberspace". In 1998 Jeremy Cooperstock, the website founder, said that Untied.com was "a Web site that offers frustrated former United Airlines passengers a chance to speak out."

== History ==
=== Founding ===
In June 1996, Jeremy Cooperstock, then a University of Toronto student, had been a passenger on a United itinerary from Toronto Pearson International Airport to Tokyo Narita International Airport. During the itinerary Cooperstock experienced lost seat reservations, a bungled connection, and having a suit in a set of luggage crushed. After that trip ended, Cooperstock wrote a complaint letter regarding the Japan flight and the service on United flights to Hawaii.

Cooperstock received no reply to his complaint. After sending a second complaint, he received a form-letter reply. He posted his letter and United's reply on his website on the University of Toronto servers saying that the airline's customer service constituted a "Poor Show." In a seven-month period thirty people contacted him, sending him additional complaints, which he also posted. He contacted the airline and told it about his webpages. United then filed a complaint with the University of Toronto, accusing the webpages of copyright infringement. Cooperstock, by then a researcher at Sony Corp., and later an assistant professor at McGill University in Montreal, Quebec, shut down the site. In April 1997, after several people supporting his webpages asked him to continue it, he registered the domain name Untied.com. An airline employee had sent Cooperstock a check with the funds needed to operate the website. Cooperstock said that he was willing to modify his webpages and change his views on United if the airline sent any type of response other than a form letter. Cooperstock said he never received a response that satisfied his demands. Cooperstock stated on Untied.com that "It was not the poor treatment we received from United, but rather the subsequent disregard for a serious, polite complaint, which led to the creation of the Web pages."

=== Subsequent history ===
Tracy L. Tuten, author of Enterprise 2.0: How Technology, Ecommerce, and Web 2.0 are Transforming Business Virtually, said that Untied.com was "Perhaps one of the earliest and best examples of a consumer taking advantage of the new power offered by the internet". Nick Kettles of The Observer said that Untied.com was "widely acknowledged as the internet's first gripe site." In 2001 the website had over 3,000 complaints against United. In 2002 Josh McHugh of Forbes said "in the five years since has been a steadfast thorn in United's side, soliciting and posting complaints from fellow sufferers and digging up internal secrets from United employees." By 2002 Untied.com received and posted reports stating that the airline supervisors covered up mechanical problems so that a flight could be airborne on schedule. By 2004, the website had received over 5,000 complaint letters. That year, Kettles said "Untied.com has become the proverbial thorn in the side." By 2004, a group of flight attendants used the website to convince UAL Corporation to give ground to their union during negotiations between the company and the union. In 2006 Cooperstock said that Untied.com receives between 50,000 and 60,000 monthly hits and that "The site has really morphed many times over the years." By 2006 it had become among the longest-operating websites complaining about companies.

In 2011 Untied.com had a redesign to make itself look like the real United.com. By November 2012, to prevent visitors from confusing the website with the real United.com, Cooperstock has visitors check a dialog box acknowledging that they are visiting Untied.com before they may proceed into the website. He argued that "No reasonable person would possibly confuse my page with United's own page."

In 2012 United Continental Holdings, the company formed by the merger between United and Continental Airlines, filed two lawsuits against Cooperstock, one in the Federal Court of Canada and one in the Superior Court of Quebec. The airline also is seeking an injunction against Cooperstock for posting the contact information of a manager at United. United argues that having this information violates the employee's privacy. Ellen Roseman of the Toronto Star said "The case has gained widespread publicity and sent a chill down the backs of many gripe site owners." Megan McCarthy, a spokesperson for United, said that the website was so similar to the real United.com that some customers were confused, and that the airline wants Cooperstock to modify the website. Cooperstock said that the airline is trying to harm his finances to force him to stop operating Untied.com, and that the airline's demands were not reasonable. Cooperstock argues that the lawsuits are strategic lawsuits against public participation (SLAPP). He made a request for donations to cover his legal fees.

By 2012 the website had 25,000 customer complaints and 200 employee complaints in its archive.

=== Injunction and ruling ===
On June 23, 2017, Canadian Federal Court judge Michael L. Phelan issued an injunction against Untied.com. The court ruling stated that Untied.com violated the copyrights of United Airlines. Cooperstock stated that he would appeal the ruling. The website material has since been blocked by Cooperstock pending further legal remedy.

== Operations ==
The website had complaints from customers and employees at United. The website's database included the complaints and the airline's responses to those complaints. Jeremy Cooperstock said, as paraphrased by David Woodfill of the East Valley Tribune, that Untied.com "evolved into a virtual community gathering spot for angry employees, disaffected customers and questions about the airline’s safety." Cooperstock uses donations to fund the website. He also places advertising links to generate additional revenue. As of 2000 Cooperstock had a colleague, an English literature professor, help him process complaints about United that the website received. As of 2012 Cooperstock puts in many hours, without pay, to maintain the website. The website includes information on the legal options of airline employees and passengers. It also has contact information for United Airlines customer service managers. It has a complaints page that has the feature of forwarding messages to the airline customer relations department. The website design deliberately mocks the design and logo on the actual United website.

In 2000 Kevin Simpson of the Denver Post said "Maintaining the site has become a sporadic pursuit" and that on some occasions Cooperstock made no edits for over a month. By the year 2000 Cooperstock said that consumer advocate groups had offered to take over the website. That year, Simpson said "So far, the right offer hasn't come along." Cooperstock said that he was willing to give up control to a consumer advocate group if the site if he believed that it would improve employee relations or more effectively resolve customer complaints.

== Reception ==
By 2000 the company United Airlines did not directly criticize the website, and instead asked customers to send complaints directly to the airline. In 2001 a spokesperson for United, Whitney Staley, said "of course we would respond to" a complaint placed on a third party website. In 2000 Cooperstock said that United Airlines was "dismissive of" Untied.com. In 2000 Cooperstock said that his website chronicled negative attitudes with United but was not effective in changing policy at the airline. Cooperstock said "It's not doing much in terms of shaping [airline policy], but it's a reflector of what public opinion is like. I figure that for every one complaint, 10 others were too apathetic to do anything."

In 2000 Cooperstock said that the airline monitors the website, particularly the sections with comments from United employees, and that people on the airline servers accessed the website 17 times per day. Cooperstock said "I think they look at the site as a means to gauge what the public is saying about them, to see what their own employees are saying. The employee pages get a lot of hits from headquarters." Kurt Ebenhoch, a spokesperson for United, said in 2000 that he was not aware of the airline monitoring untied.com. In 2002 Cooperstock said that the logs of the untied.com servers show that of all of the domains viewing the website, the United Airlines headquarters has the highest amount of traffic.

In one section of the website, "Yes, United Airlines does pay attention," Untied.com stated that as of March 1998 the airline had accessed Untied.com 900 times since its founding. Laura Bly of the Los Angeles Times stated that "And while most of United's comments are negative, Cooperstock lists a handful of success stories that he says prove 'a polite, well-phrased letter to United can often achieve effective results.'" By 2002 flight attendants had sent the website a report that a flight attendant had been raped at a hotel in Los Angeles that the airline required its flight attendants to use. After the report was publicized, the airline began using a different hotel in Los Angeles. According to Cooperstock the flight attendant's union sent him a letter congratulating him for his work on convincing the airline to use a different hotel. By 2002 the airline established an 800 toll-free customer suggestion line after Untied.com criticized the airline for forcing customers to use a 900 tolled complaint line.

Cliff Figallo and Nancy Rhine, the authors of the 2012 book Building the Knowledge Management Network: Best Practices, Tools, and Techniques for Putting Conversation to Work, said that the actual United Airlines website exhibited "a heightened attention to customer service" and that "Maybe these improvements" may have happened without pressure from Untied.com but that "the probability that disgruntled customers on the Web will find a way to raise their voices in unison should be a sobering reality to all businesses." They concluded that "Customers can and will demonstrate creatively what they need from businesses. If not supported in demonstrating this on the company's own site, they are likely to build or make use of another venue on the Web to 'get things off their chests.'"

In 2002 Charles Wolrich of Forbes ranked untied.com as one of the "Best Corporate Complaint Sites." In 2005 he ranked Untied.com as one of the "Top Corporate Hate Web Sites."

== See also ==
- United Breaks Guitars
- 2017 United Express passenger removal
