= Here's to the Heroes =

Studio album by The Ten Tenors
- Released: August 26, 2006
- Studio: Air Studios, London, England; EMI Abbey Road Studios, London, England; Jumpstart Studios, Brisbane, Queensland, Australia; Maximedia Studios, Dallas, USA; The Loft Studios, London, England; The Pass Studios, Los Angeles, USA
- Genre: Pop rock; classical; pop; vocal
- Length: 49:47
- Language: English, Spanish, Italian
- Label: Rhino Records, Warner Bros. Records

The Ten Tenors chronology
Tenology (2005)	Here's to the Heroes (2006)	Nostalgica (2008)

Here's to the Heroes is the sixth studio album from Australian vocal group The Ten Tenors, released in August 2006.

== Track listing ==
Standard Edition
No.	Title	Writer(s)	Length
1.	"Just to See Each Other Again"		4:27
2.	"Here's to the Heroes"		3:37
3.	"Buongiorno Principessa"	Nicola Piovani	3:38
4.	"There'll Come a Day"		3:37
5.	"We Have All the Time in the World"		4:00
6.	"Places"		3:56
7.	"Les Choristes"	Christophe Barratier / Bruno Coulais	3:26
8.	"You Only Live Twice"		3:22
9.	"Tick All The Days Off One By One"		4:24
10.	"Somewhere in Time (Words Without Meaning)"	Don Black	4:00
11.	"Who Wants to Live Forever"	Brian May	4:12
12.	"Gladiator Suite: Now We Are Free/ Il Gladiatore"	Hans Zimmer	6:33
Total length:			49:47

== Charts ==
=== Weekly charts ===
Chart (2006/07)	Peak position
Australian Albums (ARIA)	8
Austrian Albums (Ö3 Austria)	39
French Albums (SNEP)	53
German Albums (Offizielle Top 100)	39
Dutch Albums (Album Top 100)	33
New Zealand Albums (RMNZ)	29
Spanish Albums (PROMUSICAE)	93
Swiss Albums (Schweizer Hitparade)	69

=== Year-end charts ===
Year	Chart	Position
2006	Australian Artists ARIA Charts	40
2006	Australian Classical ARIA Charts	7
2007	Australian Classical ARIA Charts	25

== Certifications ==
Region	Certification	Certified units/sales
Australia (ARIA)	Gold	35,000^{^}
^{^} Shipments figures based on certification alone.
