= Santa Lucia (song) =

Traditional Neapolitan song

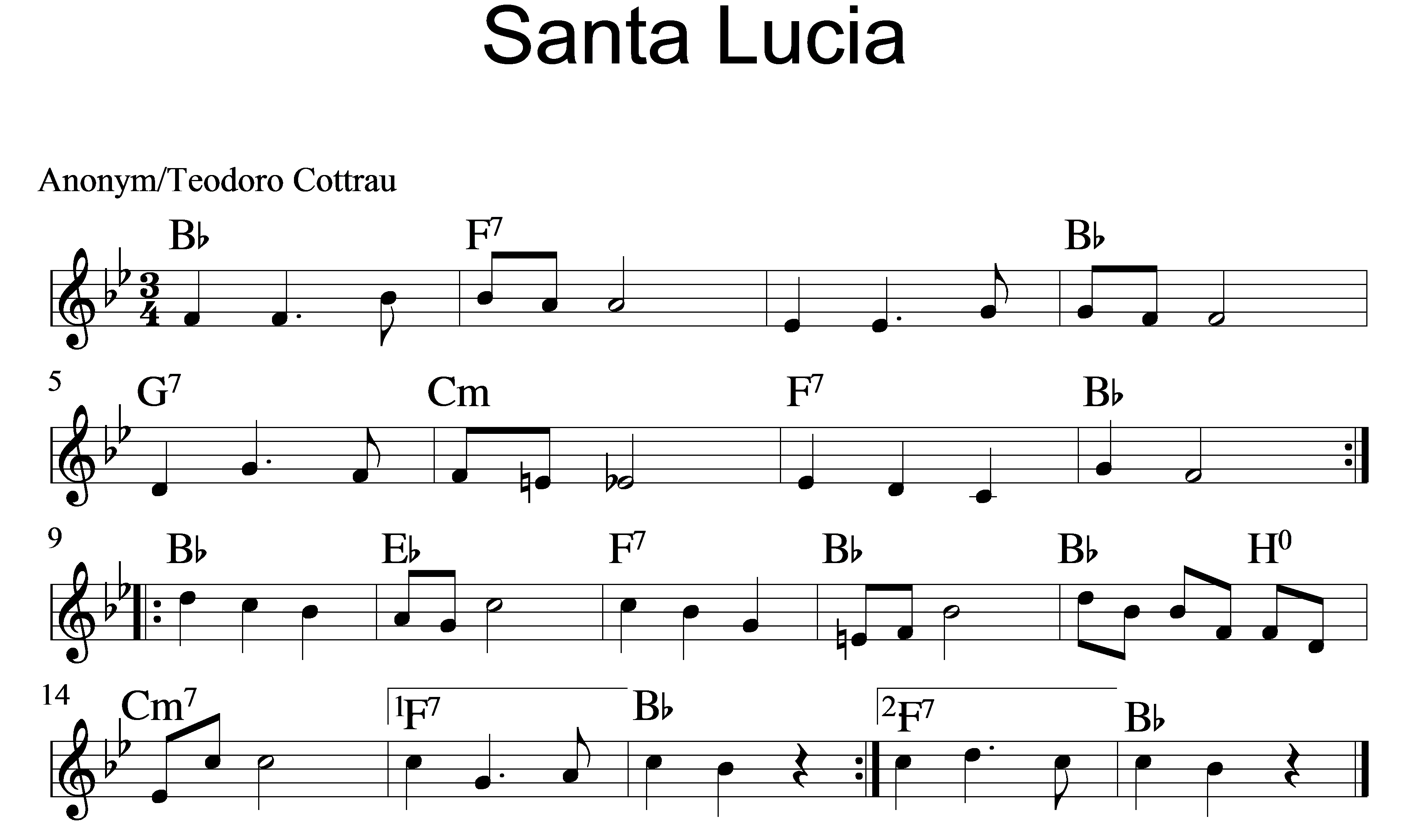

Song
- Language: Neapolitan; Italian
- Songwriter: Unknown
- Lyricist: Teodoro Cottrau (Italian)

"Santa Lucia" (Italian: [ˈsanta luˈtʃiːa], Neapolitan: [ˈsandə luˈtʃiːə]) is a traditional Neapolitan song. It was translated by Teodoro Cottrau (1827–1879) from Neapolitan into Italian and published by the Cottrau firm, as a barcarola, in Naples in 1849, during the first stage of the Italian unification. It was the first Neapolitan song to be translated into Italian. Its translator, who is often miscredited as its composer, was the son of the French-born Italian composer and collector of songs Guillaume Louis Cottrau (1797–1847). Various sources credit A. Longo with the music, 1835.

The original lyrics of "Santa Lucia" celebrate the picturesque waterfront district Borgo Santa Lucia in the Gulf of Naples, with an invitation (sales pitch) from a boatman to take a ride in his boat to better enjoy the cool evening.

== Lyrics ==
=== Neapolitan lyrics ===
Comme se frícceca
la luna chiena!
lo mare ride,
ll'aria è serena...

Vuje che facite
'mmiezo a la via?
Santa Lucia,
Santa Lucia!
(Repeated twice)

Stu viento frisco
fa risciatare:
chi vo' spassarse
jenno pe mmare?

È pronta e lesta
la varca mia
Santa Lucia,
Santa Lucia!
(Repeated twice)

La tènna è posta
pe' fa' 'na cena;
e quanno stace
la panza chiena

non c'è la mínema
melanconia.
Santa Lucia,
Santa Lucia!
(Repeated twice)

- The following two lines were included in the Neapolitan version as transcribed in the "Italia Mia" website.

Pozzo accostare la varca mia
Santa Lucia, Santa Lucia!

=== Italian lyrics ===
Italian

Sul mare luccica l’astro d’argento.
Placida è l’onda, prospero è il vento.
Sul mare luccica l’astro d’argento.
Placida è l’onda, prospero è il vento.
Venite all’agile barchetta mia,
Santa Lucia! Santa Lucia!
Venite all’agile barchetta mia,
Santa Lucia! Santa Lucia!

Con questo zeffiro, così soave,
Oh, com’è bello star sulla nave!
Con questo zeffiro, così soave,
Oh, com’è bello star sulla nave!
Su passeggeri, venite via!
Santa Lucia! Santa Lucia!
Su passeggeri, venite via!
Santa Lucia! Santa Lucia!

In fra le tende, bandir la cena
In una sera così serena,
In fra le tende, bandir la cena
In una sera così serena,
Chi non dimanda, chi non desia?
Santa Lucia! Santa Lucia!
Chi non dimanda, chi non desia?
Santa Lucia! Santa Lucia!

Mare sì placida, vento sì caro,
Scordar fa i triboli al marinaro,
Mare sì placido, vento sì caro,
Scordar fa i triboli al marinaro,
E va gridando con allegria,
Santa Lucia! Santa Lucia!
E va gridando con allegria,
Santa Lucia! Santa Lucia!

O dolce Napoli, o suol beato,
Ove sorridere volle il creato,
O dolce Napoli, o suol beato,
Ove sorridere volle il creato,
Tu sei l'impero dell’armonia,
Santa Lucia! Santa Lucia!
Tu sei l'impero dell’armonia,
Santa Lucia! Santa Lucia!

Or che tardate? Bella è la sera.
Spira un’auretta fresca e leggera.
Or che tardate? Bella è la sera.
Spira un’auretta fresca e leggera.
Venite all’agile barchetta mia,
Santa Lucia! Santa —Lucia!
Venite all’agile barchetta mia,
Santa Lucia! Santa Lucia!

English

On the sea glitters the silver star
Gentle the waves, favorable the winds.
On the sea glitters the silver star
Gentle the waves, favorable the winds.
Come into my nimble little boat,
Saint Lucy! Saint Lucy!
Come into my nimble little boat,
Saint Lucy! Saint Lucy!

With this breeze, so gentle,
Oh, how beautiful to be on the ship!
With this breeze, so gentle,
Oh, how beautiful to be on the ship!
Come aboard passengers, come on!
Saint Lucy! Saint Lucy!
Come aboard passengers, come on!
Saint Lucy! Saint Lucy!

Inside the tents, putting aside supper
On such a quiet evening,
Inside the tents, putting aside supper
On such a quiet evening,
Who wouldn't demand, who wouldn't desire?
Saint Lucy! Saint Lucy!
Who wouldn't demand, who wouldn't desire?
Saint Lucy! Saint Lucy!

Sea so calm, the wind so dear,
Forget what makes trouble for the sailor,
Sea so calm, the wind so dear,
Forget what makes trouble for the sailor,
And go shout with merriment,
Saint Lucy! Saint Lucy!
And go shout with merriment,
Saint Lucy! Saint Lucy!

O sweet Naples, O blessed soil,
Where to smile desired its creation,
O sweet Naples, upon blessed soil,
Where to smile desired its creation,
You are the kingdom of harmony,
Saint Lucy! Saint Lucy!
You are the kingdom of harmony,
Saint Lucy! Saint Lucy!

Now to linger? The evening is beautiful.
A little breeze blows fresh and light.
Now to linger? The evening is beautiful.
A little breeze blows fresh and light.
Come into my nimble little boat,
Saint Lucy! Saint —Lucy!
Come into my nimble little boat,
Saint Lucy! Saint Lucy!

=== English lyrics ===
Translation by Thomas Oliphant

VERSE 1
Now 'neath the silver moon
Ocean is glowing,
O'er the calm billows,
Soft winds are blowing.

VERSE 2
Here balmy breezes blow
Pure joys invite us,
And as we gently row,
All things delight us.

CHORUS
Hark, how the sailor's cry
Joyously echoes nigh:
Santa Lucia,
Santa Lucia!
Home of fair Poesy,
Realm of pure harmony,
Santa Lucia,
Santa Lucia!

VERSE 3
When o'er the waters
Light winds are playing,
Thy spell can soothe us,
All care allaying.

VERSE 4
To thee sweet Napoli,
What charms are given,
Where smiles creation,
Toil blest by heaven.

=== English lyrics (Perry Como Version) ===
VERSE
Soft winds caress the sea
Breezes so tender
Make every dancing wave
Gladly surrender

CHORUS
Days here are heavenly
Nights are pure ecstasy
Santa Lucia!
Santa Lucia!

== Versions ==
Perhaps the definitive 20th century recording of the song was that of the Italian opera singer, Enrico Caruso.

Mario Lanza recorded this song in this album "Mario Lanza sings Caruso favorites", RCA Victor LSC-2393.

In the United States, an early edition of the song, with an English translation by Thomas Oliphant, was published by M. McCaffrey, Baltimore.

In Sweden, Finland, Denmark, the Faroe Islands, and Norway, "Santa Lucia" has been given various lyrics to accommodate it to the winter-light Saint Lucy's Day, at the darkest time of the year. The three most famous lyrics versions in Swedish are Luciasången, also known by its incipit, Sankta Lucia, ljusklara hägring ("Saint Lucy, bright illusion"); Natten går tunga fjät ("The night walks with heavy steps"); and the 1970s "kindergarten" version, Ute är mörkt och kallt ("Outside it’s dark and cold"). The more common Norwegian version is Svart senker natten seg ("Black the night descends"), whereas the version commonly used in Denmark is titled Nu bæres lyset frem ("Now light is carried forth"). There also exists a Sámi version, Guhkkin Sicilias dolin lei nieida ("In faraway Sicily, long ago was a girl").

In the Czech Republic (or former Czechoslovakia), it was made famous with the words Krásná je Neapol ("Naples is beautiful") sung by Waldemar Matuška.

In Austria, it is famous under the title "Wenn sich der Abend mild". It is sung by Austrian fraternities.

In Thailand, Silpakorn Niyom (Thai: ศิลปากรนิยม), the anthem of Silpakorn University, borrowed the melody of "Santa Lucia"; the founder of the university, Silpa Bhirasri, was Italian. A Thai translation of "Santa Lucia" (itself was adapted from Italian version) was composed in 2017 by Professor Chedha Tingsanchali of the university's faculty of Archaeology to mark Bhirasri's 125th birthday anniversary. The translated lyrics was first premiered on 15 September of that year.

== Performances ==
- Bing Crosby included the song in a medley on his album 101 Gang Songs (1961).
- The Ray Charles Singers recorded a version for their album Rome Revisited (1962).
- Elvis Presley recorded the song on the 1965 album Elvis for Everyone! It was featured in his film Viva Las Vegas.
- Monsieur Tranquille made a disco version for his 1977 debut album Monsieur Tranquille – Faut pas m'chercher
- Tolmachevy Sisters performed it as the closing track to their 2007 debut album Polovinki and on the VGTRK TV series Subbotniy Vecher in 2006.
- Italian tenor Sergio Franchi (1926–1990) recorded this song in 1963 on his RCA Victor Red Seal album Our Man From Italy.
- Hayley Westenra included the song in her album Treasure.
