= Larger than Life (The Ten Tenors album) =

Studio album by The Ten Tenors
- Released: July 2004
- Recorded: April 2003 – January 2004
- Studios: Airlock Studios, Samford, Australia; Gaga Studios, Hamburg, Germany; Jumpstart Studios, Brisbane, Queensland, Australia; Q Studios, Sydney, New South Wales, Australia; QUT Studio, Brisbane, Queensland, Australia; Vox Klangstudio, Bendestorf, Germany
- Genres: Classical music; pop; vocal
- Length: 56:05
- Languages: English, Spanish, Italian
- Labels: Rhino Records, Warner Bros. Records

The Ten Tenors chronology
A Not So Silent Night (2001)	Larger than Life (2004)	Tenology (2005)

Professional ratings
Review scores
Source	Rating
AllMusic	3.5/5 stars

Larger than Life is the fifth studio album from Australian vocal group The Ten Tenors, released in July 2004.

== Track listing ==
Standard Edition
No.	Title	Writer(s)	Length
1.	"Water/Va Pensiero"	Richard Vella, Giuseppe Verdi	4:22
2.	"Stonde"	Patrick Abrial, Jean-Marc Grossi, Thierry Micaelli	3:46
3.	"The Way Away from You"	Steven Baker	4:13
4.	"Angel"	Craig "Butch" Atkinson	2:40
5.	"Por Una Cabeza"	Carlos Gardel	2:46
6.	"Together"	Andy Arthurs, Matthew Hickey	3:51
7.	"Feet Lift off the Ground"		5:41
8.	"Cast in Stone"		3:59
9.	"Sundance"		4:39
10.	"World Anthem"		3:59
11.	"Destiny Lies"	Craig "Butch" Atkinson, Stewart Morris	4:39
12.	"Thunder Point"		4:18
13.	"Conquest of Paradise" (featuring Shannon Brown)	Vangelis	4:05
14.	"Bicycle Race"	Freddie Mercury	3:07
Total length:			56:05

Bonus CD
No.	Title	Length
1.	"Funiculi Funicula"
2.	"Granada"
3.	"Bohemian Rhapsody"
4.	"Bee Gees Medley"
5.	"Opera Medley"
6.	"Dancing Queen"

Bonus DVD

1. "Sundance"
2. "Opera Medley" "La Donna E Mobile" (Rigoletto), "Che Gelida Manina" (La Boheme), "Va Pensiero" (Nabucco). "Largo al Factotum" (The Barber of Seville)
3. "Dancing Queen"
4. "World Anthem"

== Charts ==
Chart (2004-2006)	Peak position
Dutch Albums (Album Top 100)	71
German Albums (Offizielle Top 100)	47
Hungarian Albums (MAHASZ)	36
