= The Wonderful Company =

American privately-held holding company

- Formerly: Roll Global
- Type: Private
- Headquarters: Los Angeles, California
- Key people: Stewart Resnick; Lynda Resnick
- Revenue: US$4 billion
- Number of employees: 9,000
- Website: wonderful.com

The Wonderful Company LLC (also known as Wonderful Co., formerly Roll Global) is a private corporation based in Los Angeles, California. With revenues of over $4 billion, it functions as a holding company for Stewart and Lynda Resnick and as such is a vehicle for their personal investments in a number of businesses.

The company currently counts the following brands as business divisions: juice company POM Wonderful, bottled water company FIJI Water and flower delivery service Teleflora.

== History ==
As the current incarnation of the Resnicks' holding company, The Wonderful Company has a number of predecessors. The Resnicks first bought Teleflora and API Alarm Systems in 1979, at which time Lynda left her advertising job to become Teleflora's executive vice president of marketing, and eventually president, securing flagship TV sponsorship roles which grew the company into the nation's largest floral wire service. In 1986, they purchased The Franklin Mint, known for making model cars, souvenir plates, figurines, and Civil War-inspired chess sets. Stewart Resnick served as CEO and Chairman of the Franklin Mint Company until its sale to a private equity group in 2006. In 1989, the Resnicks formed Paramount Farms to begin growing and harvesting pistachios and almonds in California's Central Valley. In 1993, the Resnicks renamed the holding company Roll International (later Roll Global) and continued to expand their portfolio of complementary businesses in food and beverages. As of June 1, 2015, Roll Global changed its name to The Wonderful Company.

The Wonderful Company has been able to expand their agricultural operations through their ownership of the Kern Water Bank. The Kern Water Bank is a man-made underground reservoir in the Central Valley. The Department of Water Resources spent $74 million building the water bank, and it is the largest of its kind, capable of holding one million acre-feet of water. Through what some sources have called backroom negotiations, in 1994 the water bank was transferred under what's known as Monterey Plus Amendments from the public to the private ownership of the Resnicks. It was passed from the Department of Water Resources to the agribusiness-dominated Kern County Water Authority, and from there to the Kern Water Bank Authority. The Kern Water Bank Authority consists of four water districts and a private company, Westside Mutual. Westside is a shell corporation owned by Paramount Farming which is a subsidiary of The Wonderful Company. It is primarily through Westside that the Resnicks own 57% of the Water Bank. News outlets, academic papers, and advocacy groups have criticized The Wonderful Company for its possession of what was originally meant to be a public asset, and the monetary benefit they have gained through it.

The Wonderful Company has been criticized for its aggressive consumption of water in the drought ridden state of California. The company has expanded its business even as California residents have faced water shortages and the water ecosystem has been irreversibly damaged. Residents of the Central Valley, while the target of the company's charitable giving, suffer from an acute water crisis. It is also claimed that the company lobbies to privatize the state's water and funds opposition research on the impact of farming on the drought.

In 2024, the company sought to halt a new state law that would make it easier for its employees to unionize. The move came after United Farm Workers started representing some of its employees in Kern County under the recent law.

=== False marketing claims ===
In 2015, the US Federal Trade Commission concluded that marketing claims of Pom Wonderful pomegranate juice providing anti-disease benefits were deceptive and misleading.

== Brands ==
As of January 2019, the following brands are among those of The Wonderful Company and its subsidiaries:

=== POM Wonderful ===
In 2002, the Resnicks founded POM Wonderful. The company's main product is pomegranate juice, which is sold in a trademark "double-bulb" bottle. The company also packages and sells POM POMS fresh pomegranate arils as well as fresh pomegranates. The company also sells a variety of pomegranate flavored teas. In 2017, POM Wonderful acquired the pomegranate distributor Ruby Fresh.

=== FIJI Water ===
Wonderful, formerly known as Roll International bought Fiji Water in 2004.

=== Wonderful Halos ===
In 2013, the Resnicks launched Wonderful Halos mandarins, with a $220 million facility in the San Joaquin Valley capable of processing 19 million mandarins a day. By 2017 Halos was the #1 segment brand, forecast to have around 70-80% market share by 2018. In 2017, Halos accounted for around three-quarters of growth in the mandarin category, and 12% of total produce sales growth.

=== Wonderful Pistachios ===
Wonderful's pistachios were linked to multi-state outbreak in 2016 and were recalled.

Wonderful grows between 15% and 20% of the U.S. pistachio crop as of 2024, with most of it being exported to China.

=== Wonderful Sweet Scarletts ===
A variety of red grapefruit known for its sweetness, The Wonderful Company’s Sweet Scarletts brand has been grown and packed in South Texas since 2014 and distributed to grocery stores nationwide.

=== JUSTIN Wines ===
In 2010 the Resnicks purchased Justin Vineyards and Winery, a 50,000 case-production winery in California's Central Coast region founded in 1981.

=== Landmark Wines ===
Acquired in 2011, Landmark Wines is a Sonoma County vineyard specializing in Chardonnay, Pinot Noir and Syrah.

=== JNSQ Wines ===
In 2019, the Resnicks launched a female-focused luxury wine brand, JNSQ (named for the French phrase "je ne sais quoi"). JNSQ Rosé Cru and JNSQ Sauvignon Blanc made their debut alongside the Fall/Winter 2019 collection from California-born designers Kate and Laura Mulleavy of Rodarte, who brought their show to Los Angeles (instead of New York Fashion Week) on February 5.

=== Teleflora ===
The Resnicks purchased Teleflora in 1979, at which time Lynda left her advertising job to become the company's executive vice president of marketing and eventually president. In 2019, Teleflora had over 13,000 member florists throughout the U.S. and Canada, with an additional 20,000 affiliated florists outside North America, making it the largest privately held floral wire service in the world.

== Water supply misinformation ==
During the January 2025 Southern California wildfires, the Resnicks and the Wonderful Company were criticized for hoarding water from the Kern Water Bank, a water reserve 150 mi (240 km) from Los Angeles. Holding billions of gallons, the Kern Water Bank is majority-controlled by the Resnicks and the Wonderful Company, but this water supply was not under consideration nor was it requested by the Los Angeles Fire Department to fight the wildfires, indicating that the accusations of water hoarding were misinformation.

In January, the Wonderful Company pledged a $10 million donation to support relief efforts for the Los Angeles fires.
