= Amigos Para Siempre (album) =

Live album by The Ten Tenors with RTVE Symphony Orchestra
- Released: November 29, 2009
- Recorded: Madrid, Spain, August 2009.
- Genre: Crossover jazz; classical; vocal; opera
- Length: 51:10
- Language: English, Spanish, Italian
- Label: Warner Music Group

The Ten Tenors albums chronology
| Nostalgica (2008) | Amigos Para Siempre (2009) | Double Platinum (2011) |

Amigos Para Siempre (transl. "Friends for Life") is a live album from Australian vocal group The Ten Tenors with the RTVE Symphony Orchestra. The album was recorded live in Madrid, Spain in August 2009 and released as a CD/DVD set across Europe and Australia.

The album peaked at number 33 in Spain in January 2010.

== Track listing ==
CD/DVD
| No. | Title | Writer(s) | Length |
|---|---|---|---|
| 1. | "Overture / Funiculì, Funiculà" | Luigi Denza, Peppino Turco | 4:04 |
| 2. | "Mattinata" | Ruggero Leoncavallo | 2:14 |
| 3. | "Torna a Surriento" | Giambattista De Curtis, Ernesto De Curtis | 3:40 |
| 4. | "Bésame Mucho" | Consuelo Velázquez | 3:14 |
| 5. | "En Aranjuez con tu Amor" | Joaquín Rodrigo | 3:50 |
| 6. | "Moon River" | Henry Mancini, Johnny Mercer | 3:54 |
| 7. | "What a Wonderful World" | Bob Thiele, George David Weiss | 4:20 |
| 8. | "Who Wants to Live Forever" | Brian May | 5:04 |
| 9. | "The Boxer" | Paul Simon | 4:51 |
| 10. | "Amigos Para Siempre" | Andrew Lloyd Webber, Don Black | 4:38 |
| 11. | "Granada" | Agustín Lara | 4:04 |
| 12. | "Nessun Dorma" | Giacomo Puccini | 3:20 |
| 13. | "In My Life" | | 3:57 |
| Total length: | | | 51:10 |

== Charts ==
| Chart (2010) | Peak position |
|---|---|
| Australian Music DVD Charts | 40 |
| Spanish Albums (PROMUSICAE) | 33 |

== Release history ==
| Region | Date | Label | Format | Catalogue number |
|---|---|---|---|---|
| Europe | 29 November 2009 | Warner Music Group | CD / DVD | 5186572032 |
| Australia | 7 May 2010 | Warner Music Australia | CD / DVD | 5186595942 |
