= BloomNation =

American e-commerce company

- Company type: Private
- Founded: Santa Monica, California (August 2011)
- Headquarters: Santa Monica, {{{location_country}}}
- Founders: Farbod Shoraka, Gregg Weisstein and David Daneshgar
- Services: E-commerce Platform and Marketplace for Local Florists
- Employees: 65
- Website: bloomnation.com

BloomNation is an American online floral marketplace with about 3,500 florists delivering to nearly 5,000 cities across the country. As an “Etsy-type” site for flowers, customers connect directly with local florists whose flower arrangements are highlighted in the marketplace. The florists upload their own real photos of their floral design as no stock catalog images are allowed. In the marketplace, customers can browse flower arrangements and reviews from participating florists all in one place.

== History ==
BloomNation is headquartered in Santa Monica, California and was founded by Farbod Shoraka, Gregg Weisstein and David Daneshgar in 2011. The original concept of a marketplace for florists was developed by Farbod after hearing the struggles of his aunt, who is a local florist. The business plan was developed at the University of Chicago, Booth School of Business where Shoraka, Weisstein and Daneshgar won the university's New Venture Challenge. Initial seed funding was obtained when Daneshgar, a former World Series of Poker champion, won a two-day poker tournament in Los Angeles. This gave the company enough funding to create a beta version of the marketplace and establish proof of concept.

While no longer an option, BloomNation was the first national floral website to accept bitcoin. In 2023, BloomNation expanded its services to Canada. In 2024, BloomNation expanded its services to include full support in Spanish, encompassing marketing, sales implementation, and customer success. That same year, the company launched BloomNation POS 2.0, an upgraded point-of-sale system designed to help florists streamline daily operations and reduce operational costs. In 2025, BloomNation introduced a range of new partnerships aimed at wholesalers, growers, suppliers, and affiliates, further broadening its network within the floral industry.

== Funding ==
BloomNation raised $1.65 million in seed funding. The round was led by Chris Dixon at Andreessen Horowitz and included participation from Spark Capital, Chicago Ventures and CrunchFund.

In October 2014, BloomNation raised an additional $5.55 million series A round from Ronny Conway, Andreessen Horowitz, Spark Capital, Chicago Ventures and Crunchfund. The additional resources will help the company expand its curated network of florists, introduce a wedding/event service and launch a mobile app.
