= Kern Water Bank =

Public-private partnership in California, US

Coordinates: 35°18′N 119°16′W

The Kern Water Bank is a public-private partnership which oversees a 32 sq mi (83 km^{2}) water recharge basin in California. It sources water from the Kern River, the State Water Project, and the Central Valley Project. It stores underground up to 1,500,000 acre⋅ft (1,900,000 ML).

57% of the bank is controlled by Stewart Resnick and Lynda Resnick, the owners of Pom Wonderful and Halos oranges. In 2021, their stake was estimated to be worth over $1 billion.
