= Teodoro Cottrau =

Italian composer, lyricist and publisher (1827–1879)

- Born: 7 December 1827; Naples, Kingdom of the Two Sicilies
- Died: 30 March 1879 (aged 51) Naples, Kingdom of Italy
- Genres: Neapolitan song
- Occupations: Composer; lyricist; publisher
- Father: Guillaume Louis Cottrau

Teodoro Cottrau (Italian pronunciation: [teoˈdɔːro kotˈtro]; 7 December 1827 – 30 March 1879) was an Italian composer, lyricist, publisher, journalist and politician. He specialised in Neapolitan folk songs.

The son of French composer and musicologist Guillaume Louis Cottrau, he is best known for his arrangement of "Santa Lucia", published in 1850 and recorded among others by Enrico Caruso and Elvis Presley.
