= Teleflora =

Floral wire service company

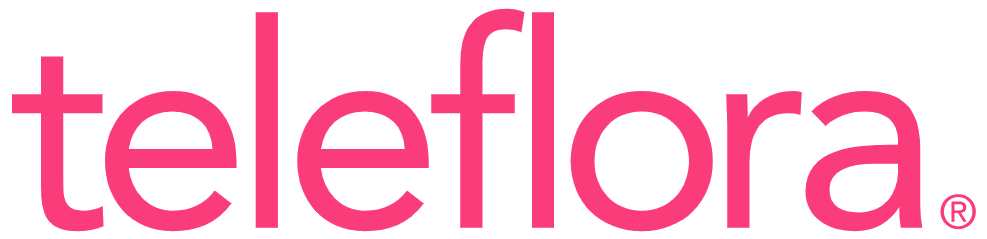
- Type: Subsidiary
- Industry: Retail
- Founded: 1934; 92 years ago
- Headquarters: Los Angeles, California,
- Products: Flowers
- Parent: The Wonderful Company (1979–present)
- Website: www.teleflora.com

Teleflora is a floral wire service company which brokers orders to local florists for delivery. It has been a subsidiary of The Wonderful Company since 1979. Teleflora's mission is to provide florists with support services and products needed to operate a floral company. This includes specialty containers for arrangements, florist point of sale systems, floral e-commerce websites for florists, digital marketing services, and design classes and other education programming.

== History ==
Headquartered in Los Angeles, California, Teleflora, LLC is a clearinghouse for transmitting and processing floral orders to customers throughout the United States and internationally. Teleflora, LLC was formerly known as Telegraph Delivery Service and was founded in 1934 by Edwin S. Douglas. Privately owned since 1979 by Lynda Resnick and Stewart Resnick, husband and wife, the company has 3,000 employees worldwide in 20 countries.

Teleflora's mission is to provide florists with support services and products needed to operate a floral company. This includes specialty containers for arrangements, florist point of sale systems, floral e-commerce websites for florists, digital marketing services, and design classes and other education programming.

In 2013, Teleflora acquired Toronto-based Flowerbuyer.com, a company with more than 2,500 active customers.

=== Advertising ===
Teleflora ran an advertisement during the 2011 Super Bowl featuring Faith Hill; in the advertisement, a man sends flowers to his girlfriend with the message "Dear Kim, your rack is unreal". Unfortunately, his love letter is a "bust." Teleflora's partnership with Faith Hill included a new collection of flower arrangements for Valentine's Day 2011.

In 2012, Teleflora ran a similar Super Bowl campaign, this time with model Adriana Lima. A 2022 advertisement features Mrs. Claus. Another ad campaign shows a teacher receiving flowers from a student.
