= ProFlowers =

American flower retailer

- Type: Subsidiary
- Industry: Retail
- Founded: April 1998; 28 years ago
- Headquarters: Downers Grove, Illinois
- Key people: Charlie Cole (CEO)
- Products: Flowers
- Parent: Florists' Transworld Delivery
- Website: www.proflowers.com

ProFlowers is a flower retailer in the United States. It is an e-commerce company that sells products shipped from growers, suppliers and its own distribution facilities to consumers. ProFlowers was headquartered in San Diego, California. It is a wholly owned subsidiary of FTD Companies.

== History ==
ProFlowers, later called "Provide Commerce", was started by Jared Polis in 1998. In February 2006 Liberty Media Corporation (NYSE:L; LMC.B) purchased Provide Commerce, Inc. (Nasdaq: PRVD) for a sum of $477 million in cash, at which point Provide Commerce became a wholly owned subsidiary of Liberty Media. Provide Commerce also offers fruit, sweets and gift baskets direct from the supplier through its Gourmet Food Business Unit, which includes the brand names Cherry Moon Farms, Secret Spoon and Shari's Berries.

In 2007 Provide Commerce was selected as one of California's Best Places to Work (Sponsored by Employers Group 2007).

In 2008 Provide Commerce acquired RedEnvelope, a seller of gifts.

In 2010, Provide Commerce acquired Personal Creations, a personalized gifting company.

In June 2013, Provide Commerce acquired Gifts.com, a premium gifting company.

In November 2014, Provide Commerce acquired Sincerely, a mobile app gifting startup.

In 2014, flower delivery service Florists' Transworld Delivery agreed to buy ProFlowers and its sister gifting brands for $430 million, creating a combined company with over $1 billion in revenue. FTD Cos. completed its purchase of Provide Commerce Dec. 31, 2014.

In August 2019, PlanetArt, a subsidiary of the Claranova Group, acquired the assets of Personal Creations from FTD Companies, a U.S. floral and gifting company. Personal Creations was an online retailer of personalized products, including gifts and affiliated brands such as Gifts.com.

== Litigation ==
ProFlowers was sued by its major rival, Florists' Transworld Delivery (FTD), for false advertising and unfair competition in August 2005. The suit focused on ProFlowers' claim to ship "direct from the fields" with "no middlemen", alleging that the company actually often stored flowers in refrigerated warehouses, including those of third parties. For its part, ProFlowers responded that the lawsuit was "without merit" and brought counterclaims against FTD. The lawsuit was settled a year later. ProFlowers did agree to make some modifications to its advertising, although as of February 2008, ProFlowers is once again claiming in its TV commercials that it delivers flowers "straight to the door from the growers' fields".

Two months after the FTD suit was filed, two law firms filed a class action lawsuit claiming that ProFlowers used deceptive marketing, also targeting the company's freshness claims. ProFlowers called it a copycat of the FTD lawsuit. It was settled with ProFlowers not admitting any wrongdoing, but offering $10 store credits to the millions of customers in the class, paying $250,000 in attorneys' fees, and "altering its advertising".

In September 2009 a class action lawsuit was filed against Provide-Commerce, the owner of ProFlowers and Encore Marketing the owner of Easy Saver, for fraud, with ProFlowers customers signed up unknowingly for the latter service leading to an unsolicited monthly fee.

In February 2011 a federal class action was filed accusing Provide-Commerce and Clarus Marketing Group of defrauding online shoppers by enrolling them in a membership program that costs $9 to $15 a month if they click on ads offering free shipping with a purchase.
