= The Ten Tenors =

Australian musical ensemble

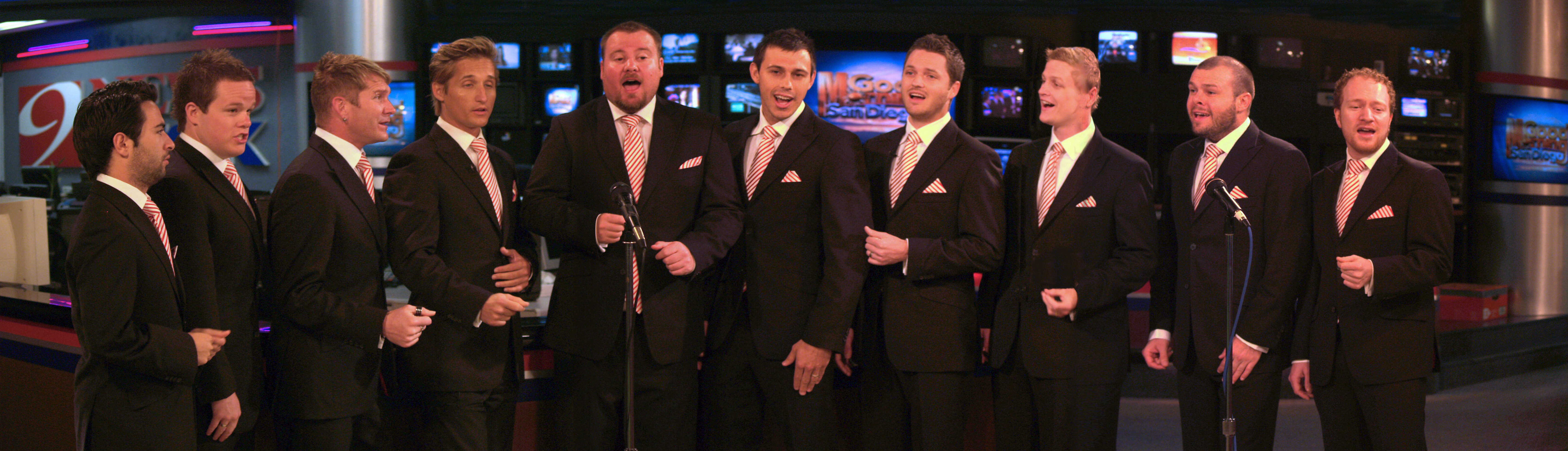
the Ten Tenors while performing at KUSI-TV in San Diego

The TEN Tenors (also known as TTT) are an Australian music ensemble, first formed in 1995.

== Current members ==
- Cameron Barclay
- Nicholas Matters
- Michael Edwards (MD)
- Andrew Waldin
- Thomas Weaver
- Ben Cody-Osborne
- Shaun Kohlman
- Ben Clark
- Jack Jordan
- Sam Ward

Band

- Benjamin Kiehne (Piano)
- Trent Bryson-Dean (Drums)

Note: The roster of members does change – the above list is current as at April 2023.

== Creatives ==
- Director/Producer: D-J Wendt
- Musical Director: Michael Edwards
- Lighting Designer: Jamie Schmidt
- Staging/Choreography: Cameron Barclay

== Previous members ==
- Craig Atkinson
- Robert Barbaro
- Daniel Belle
- Ammon Bennett
- Thomas David Birch
- Shannon Brown
- Shaun Brown
- Nick Carter
- Benjamin Clark
- Roger Davy
- Scott Fields
- Toby Francis
- Graham Foote
- George Forgan-Smith
- Jack Fowles
- Lucas Gelsumini
- Drew Graham
- Gordon Harris
- Craig Hendry
- Matthew Hickey
- Chad Hilligus
- Garry Jones
- Luke Kennedy
- David Kidd
- Kim Kirkman
- Nathan Kneen
- Rosario La Spina
- Adrian Li Donni
- Adam Lopez
- Bradley McCaw
- Liam McLachlan
- Sebastian Maclaine
- Kent Maddock
- Dion Molinas
- Greg Moore
- Stewart Morris
- Joseph Naim
- Boyd Owen
- Adrian Phillips
- Josh Piterman
- Jordan S. Pollard
- Andrew Pryor
- Sam Roberts-Smith
- Kyle Sapsford
- Jason Short
- Dominic Smith
- JD Smith
- Steve Sowden
- Tod Strike
- Jeff Teale
- Jason Turnbull
- Florian Voss
- Sam Ward
- Bernard Wheaton
- Nigel Huckle
- Sam Ward
- Riley Sutton
- Paul Gelsumini
- Scott Muller
- James Dean Smith
- Callum Warrander
- Jesse Layt
- Ben Stephens

== Discography ==
=== Studio albums ===
List of studio albums, with selected chart positions and certifications
Title	Album details	Peak chart positions					Certifications
Title	Album details	AUS	ESP	GER	NED	NZ	Certifications
Tenorissimo!	Released: 3 August 1998 (Australia); Label: Ocean Records; Format: CD	—	—	—	—	—	
Colours	Released: 18 August 1999 (Australia); Label: Ocean Records; Format: CD	—	—	—	—	—	
Untied / One is Not Enough	Released: 2000 (Australia); Released: 15 February 2002 (Europe); Label: Ocean Records / Koch Classics; Format: CD	—	—	72	18	—	
A Not So Silent Night	Released: 19 November 2001 (Australia); Label: Ocean Records / Koch Classics; Formats: CD; Christmas album	94	—	—	—	—	
Larger Than Life	Released: July 2004 (Europe); Label: Warner Music / Rhino Records; Formats: CD, digital download	—	—	47	71	—	
Here's to the Heroes	Released: 26 August 2006 (Australia); Label: Warner Music / Rhino Records; Formats: CD, digital download	8	90	39	33	21	ARIA: Gold
Nostalgica	Released: 18 July 2008 (Australia); Label: Warner Music; Formats: CD, digital download; Live album	27	—	61	—	—	
Double Platinum	Released: 22 July 2011; Label: Warner Music, Edel; Formats: CD, digital download; Live album	17	—	—	—	6	
On Broadway (Vol. 1)	Released: 14 May 2014; Label: Frog in a Sock Limited; Formats: CD, digital download	44	—	—	—	—	
Our Christmas Wish	Released: 13 November 2015; Label: MGM; Formats: CD, digital download; Christmas album	16	—	—	—	—	
In Mezzo al Mare	Released: 11 April 2016; Label: Frog in a Sock Limited; Formats: CD, digital download	—	—	—	—	—	
Wish You Were Here	Released: 7 April 2017; Label: Sony Music Entertainment; Formats: CD, digital download	18	—	—	—	3	
Love Is in the Air	Released: 26 April 2019; Label: Sony Music Entertainment; Formats: CD, digital download	23	—	—	—	—	
"—" denotes items which were not released in that country or did not chart.

=== Live albums ===
List of studio albums, with selected chart positions and certifications
Title	Album details	Peak chart positions		Certifications
Title	Album details	AUS	ESP	Certifications
Amigos Para Siempre: Live in Madrid (with RTVE Symphony Orchestra)	Released: 27 November 2009 (Europe); Label: Warner Music; Formats: CD + DVD, digital download; Live album	40°	29	

- ° Australian Music DVD Chart.

=== Compilation albums ===
List of studio albums, with selected chart positions and certifications
Title	Album details	Peak chart positions		Certifications
Title	Album details	AUS	NZ	Certifications
Tenology	Released: July 2005 (Australia); Label: Warner Music Australia; Formats: CD, digital download; First "best of" compilation	8	21	AUS: Platinum
The Best So Far	Released: 26 October 2018; Label: Sony; Formats: CD, digital download, streaming			

== Video albums ==
List of video albums, with selected chart positions and certifications
Title	Album details	Peak chart positions	Certifications
Title	Album details	AUS	Certifications
Larger Than Life	Released: July 2005; Label: Warner Australia; Formats: DVD	9	ARIA: Platinum
Here's to the Heroes	Released: December 2006; Label: Warner Australia; Formats: DVD	26	ARIA: Platinum
Amigos Para Siempre	Released: July 2010; Label: Warner; Formats: DVD	40	

== Awards ==
=== Mo Awards ===
The Australian Entertainment Mo Awards (commonly known informally as the Mo Awards), were annual Australian entertainment industry awards. They recognise achievements in live entertainment in Australia from 1975 to 2016. The Ten Tenors won one awards in that time.

Year	Nominee / work	Award	Result (wins only)
2003	The Ten Tenors	Vocal of the Year	Won
