= Double Platinum (The Ten Tenors album) =

Studio album by The Ten Tenors
- Released: July 22, 2011
- Genre: Pop rock; classical; pop; vocal
- Language: English, Spanish, Italian
- Label: Frog In A Sock, Edel Records, Warner Bros. Records
- Producer: Steven Baker

The Ten Tenors chronology
Amigos Para Siempre (2009)	Double Platinum (2011)	On Broadway (Vol. 1) (2014)

Double Platinum is the eighth studio album from Australian vocal group The Ten Tenors, released in July 2011.

== Track listing ==
Disc 1
No.	Title	Writer(s)	Length
1.	"Bohemian Rhapsody"	Freddie Mercury
2.	"Wind of Change"	Klaus Meine
3.	"I'd Do Anything for Love"	Jim Steinman
4.	"Angel"	Sarah McLachlan
5.	"Against All Odds"	Phil Collins
6.	"I Don't Want to Miss a Thing"	Diane Warren
7.	"Hallelujah"	Leonard Cohen
8.	"The Show Must Go On"	Queen
9.	"Hey Jude"	John Lennon, Paul McCartney

Disc 2
No.	Title	Writer(s)	Length
1.	"Anvil Chorus"	Giuseppe Verdi
2.	"Miserere"	Zucchero Fornaciari
3.	"En Aranjuez con tu Amor"	Joaquín Rodrigo
4.	"Rondine al nido"	Vincenzo de Crescenzo
5.	"Bring Him Home"	Alain Boublil, Claude-Michel Schönberg, Herbert Kretzmer
6.	"Amigos Para Siempre"	Andrew Lloyd Webber
7.	"Pie Jesu"	Andrew Lloyd Webber
8.	"Nessun dorma"	Giacomo Puccini

== Charts ==
Double Platinum debuted at number 24 on the ARIA Charts on 1 August 2011. The album peaked at number 17 three weeks later. The album peaked at number 1 on the ARIA Classical Charts.

=== Weekly charts ===
Chart (2011)	Peak position
Australian Albums (ARIA)	17
New Zealand Albums (RMNZ)	6

=== Year-end charts ===
Chart (2011)	Position
Australian Classical ARIA Charts	3
