= Guillaume Louis Cottrau =

French composer and music publisher (1797–1847)

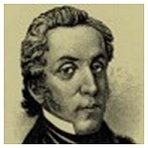
- Born: 10 August 1797; Paris, French First Republic
- Died: 31 October 1847 (aged 50); Naples, Kingdom of the Two Sicilies
- Occupations: Musician; music publisher
- Children: Teodoro Cottrau

Guillaume Louis Cottrau (10 August 1797 – 31 October 1847) was a French-Italian composer and music publisher.

Having moved to Naples with his father who served Joachim Murat, the King of Naples, Cottrau undertook the publication of Passatempi musicali, a collection of Neapolitan songs, some of his compositions. Thanks to this, the genre crossed the borders of the kingdom and reached great diffusion and popularity abroad.

One of his themes was taken up by Franz Liszt for his "Tarentelle napolitaine" included in Années de pèlerinage. His son Teodoro Cottrau was also a composer.
