= Fiji Water =

Brand of bottled water

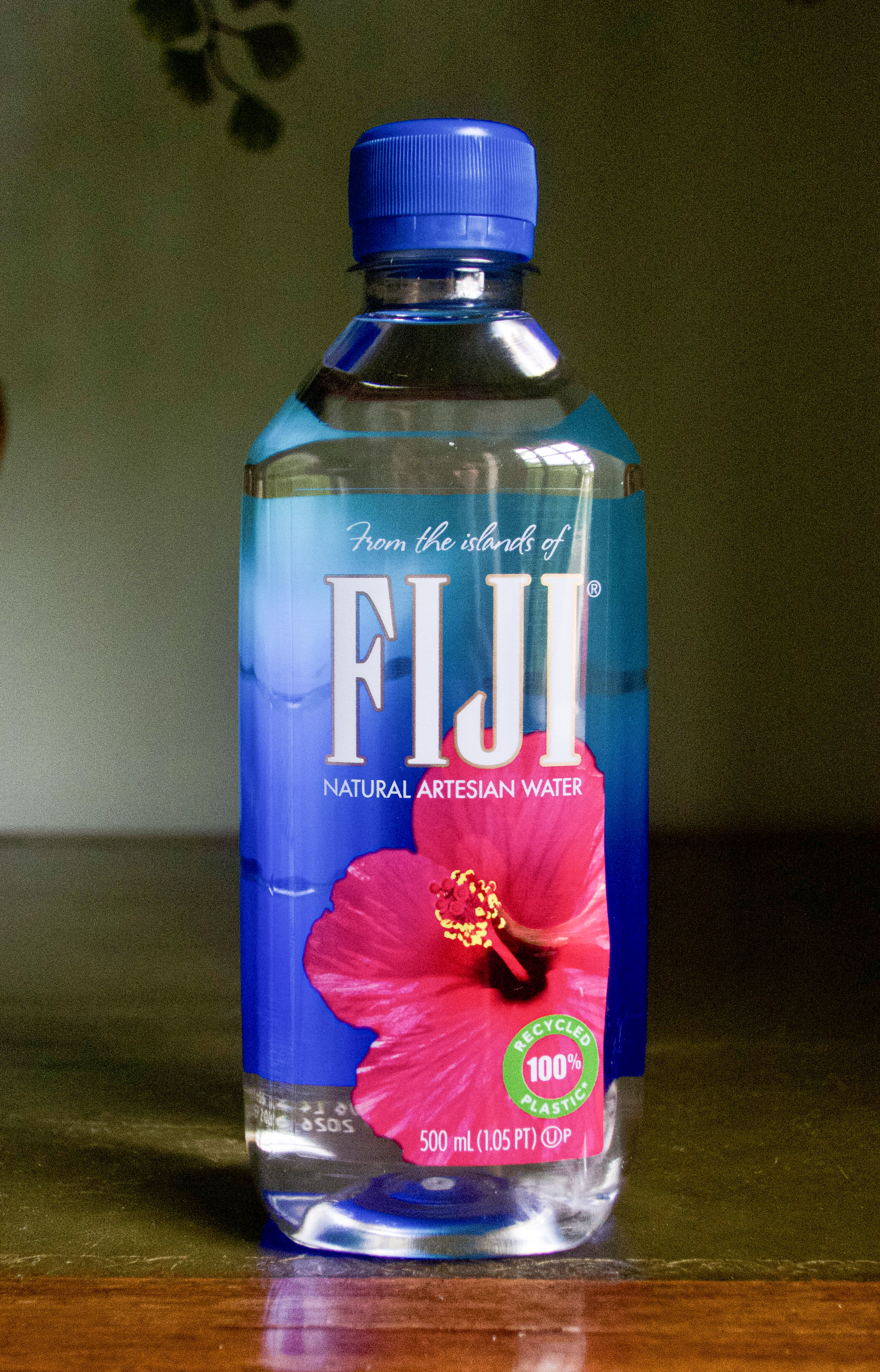
- Country: Fiji
- Introduced: 1996; 30 years ago
- Source: Artesian aquifer
- Type: Artesian
- pH: 7.3 – 7.7
- Calcium (Ca): 18
- Fluoride (F): .26
- Magnesium (Mg): 15
- Silica (SiO_{2}): 93
- TDS: 222
- Website: fijiwater.com
- All concentrations in milligrams per liter (mg/L); pH without units

Fiji Water is a brand of bottled water owned by the American conglomerate The Wonderful Company. According to marketing materials, the water comes from an artesian aquifer in Viti Levu. Fiji Water is headquartered in Los Angeles, California.

== History ==
Canadian businessman David Gilmour founded Fiji Water under the name Natural Waters of Viti Ltd. in 1996. Stewart and Lynda Resnick's Roll Global (since renamed to The Wonderful Company) acquired Fiji Water from Gilmour in 2004 for a reported US$50 million.

Fiji Water acquired Justin Vineyards & Winery in 2010.

== In Fiji ==
Fiji Water bottles water from Fiji and ships it overseas. The water is sourced from Yaqara, on the north shore of Viti Levu, the largest island of Fiji.

In 2007–2008, disputes with the Fiji government over export duties led to legal cases, impounded shipments and a self-imposed industry-wide shutdown of Fijian water bottlers. The government eventually dropped its proposed 20-cent per litre tax. In December 2008, Fiji Water laid off 40 percent of its staff due to weakening sales.

In November 2010, Fiji deported Fiji Water director of external affairs David Roth for "interfering in Fiji's domestic affairs," leading to the resignation of interim defence and immigration minister, Ratu Epeli Ganilau. Shortly afterwards, there was an increase in the extraction tax from one-third of a Fiji cent per litre to 15 cents per litre for producers over 15 million litres per month. The company would shut down its Fiji Island offices on November 29, 2010. The purpose of the raise was to increase Fiji Water's tax contribution to the Fiji Government on the F$150 million (AUD 82 million) they exported each year from F$500,000 to F$22.6 million.

Initially, the next step for the brand was to move operations to New Zealand. However, after threats from the government to give the well to another company, Fiji Water announced its intent to resume operations and accept the new tax levy.

In December 2010, Fiji Water's Fiji plant had 400 employees. The company also established a foundation to provide water filters to rural Fiji communities, 50% of which lacked access to clean water at the time. As of 2018, it was down to 12%.

In 2024, the Federal Trade Commission issued a recall of almost two million Fiji Water bottles due to elevated levels of manganese and three bacterial genera in products sold between February and March. The products were classified by the U.S. Food and Drug Administration as "not likely to cause adverse health consequence".

== Marketing ==
Fiji Water uses the slogan "Earth's finest water."

In 2006, Fiji Water ran an advertisement stating, "The label says Fiji because it's not bottled in Cleveland". This was taken as an insult by the U.S. city's water department. The Cleveland Water Department ran tests comparing a bottle of Fiji Water to Cleveland tap water and some other national bottled brands. Fiji Water reportedly contained 6.31 micrograms of arsenic per litre, whereas the tap water of Cleveland contained none.

== Environmental impact ==
Fast Company reported in 2007 that the factory machinery to extract water from underground is run on diesel fuel. Producing one Fiji Water bottle uses 1.75 gallons of water and 2,000 times more energy than tap water. In 2008, to reduce its carbon footprint, the company announced plans to plant natural forest. However the company's portion of its website that tracked its progress was shut down by 2011. By 2019, only 50% of the area of natural forest the company promised was planted. Fiji Water's carbon negative plan will not be met until at least 2037. Aja Romano from Vox wrote that "the long-term impact of globally exporting drinking water is a giant mess of un-recycled plastic clogging landfills." While Romano's quote is in reference to the water bottling industry overall, her article was focused on Fiji Water.

On January 31, 2025, environmental watchdog group The Plastic Coalition filed a lawsuit against Fiji Water, claiming the company's marketing of the product as "natural artesian water" is false given that tests show that it contains harmful microplastics and the chemical BPA.
