= Ellen Roseman =

Canadian journalist

Ellen Roseman (born July 1947) is a Canadian writer, journalist and lecturer specializing in personal finance and consumer issues. She currently writes a column handling consumer complaints for the Toronto Star and teaches at Ryerson University and the University of Toronto. She has been an editor and columnist for the Toronto Star and The Globe and Mail. She is the author of a number of books and co-author with Phil Edmonston of The Canadian Consumers’ Survival Book. She lives in Toronto, Ontario and is married to Edward Trapunski. She has two children.

== Journalism career ==
Roseman was born in July 1947 in Montreal, Quebec. She received a B.A. in 1968 from McGill University, where she was a reporter and features editor for the McGill Daily student newspaper. She received an M.A. in philosophy at the University of Toronto in 1969. Her journalism career began in 1969 at Maclean-Hunter in Toronto where she covered women’s wear at Style magazine and won two Kenneth R. Wilson awards for business writing. From 1975 to 1996, she was a columnist at the Globe and Mail specializing in consumer issues. She was appointed associate managing editor of the Globe’s business section, the Report on Business, while continuing to write her column. She was Business Editor at the Toronto Star from 1997 to 1998 and a columnist from 1999 to 2016, writing about consumer and personal finance issues in the Business Section.

== Non-profit organizations ==
- Director at Credit Counselling Service of Toronto (now called Credit Canada Debt Solutions), 1990-1996.
- Director at Credit Canada, 2000-2005.
- Board chair at Credit Canada, 2003-2005.
- Director at Family Service Association of Toronto (now called Family Service Toronto), 1999-2004.
- Director, Starnews Credit Union (now called Luminus Financial), 2006-2010.
- First public director on the Financial Planning Standards Council, 2008-2012.
- Director, Community Legal Education Ontario (CLEO), 2011–present.
- Appointed as member of the Ontario Securities Commission’s investor advisory committee, 2005-2006.
- Director, Canadian Foundation for Advancement of Investor Rights (FAIR Canada), 2008–present.
- Board of Directors of FAIR Canada, 2009–present.
- Toronto Public Library’s individual giving committee.
- Set up a fund in 2005 at the Toronto Foundation, a charitable organization dedicated to improving life in the city of Toronto, and uses it to sponsor a lecture series on practical ethics at the University of Toronto philosophy department

== Bibliography ==
- Consumer, Beware!, New Press, 1974.
- Canadian Consumers’ Survival Book (with Phil Edmonston), General Publishing, 1977.
- Canadian Parents’ Sourcebook: What You Need to Know about Baby Goods and Services (with Colleen Darragh), Doubleday Canada, 1986.
- Ellen Roseman’s Money Guide for Modern Families, Doubleday Canada, 1995.
- Money 101: Every Canadian’s Guide to Personal Finance, Wiley Canada, 2002.
- Money 201: More Personal Finance Advice for every Canadian, Wiley Canada, 2003.
- Fight Back: 81 Ways to Help You Save Money and Protect Yourself from Corporate Trickery, Wiley Canada, 2012.
