= John Walden (businessman) =

John Carl Walden (born 7 January 1960) is an American businessman who has been chief executive or chairman of several U.S. and U.K.-based consumer businesses including Home Retail Group, Holland & Barrett, Snowfox Group and Motorpoint Group.

== Early life ==
Walden was born near Chicago, Illinois. He received his J.D. from Chicago-Kent College of Law at the Illinois Institute of Technology in 1986, his M.B.A. from the Kellogg School of Management at Northwestern University in 1994, and his B.S. in Finance from the University of Illinois in 1983.

== Career ==
In 1990, Walden began his retail career as chief operating officer of Peapod. In 1999, he joined Best Buy as the president of its Internet and direct channels division. He then became the company's executive vice president of human capital and leadership and, subsequently, the executive vice president of its Customer Business Group.

After Best Buy, Walden moved to Sears Holding Company, where he acted as chief customer officer and executive vice president. Afterward, he served as the founder, president and CEO of Inversion Inc. and as chief executive officer of Activeion Cleaning Solutions.

He became managing director of Argos Ltd., the U.K.'s largest general merchandise retailer, in February 2012 and was promoted to chief executive officer of Argos' parent company, Home Retail Group in March 2014. In 2016, it was announced that Walden would be stepping down as the CEO of Home Retail Group upon sale of the group to Sainsbury's.

In March 2017 Walden was hired by FTD Companies Inc. to assist in the turnaround of this U.S. based floral and gifting business. November 2018, Walden was hired as executive chairman of Holland & Barrett Ltd, the U.K.'s largest independent health and wellness retailer. In 2019, it was announced that Walden would be hired as chairman of Majestic Wine. He later served as chairman of Naked Wines plc after the de-merger of Majestic Wines. Walden has also served as chairman of Snowfox Group (formerly YO Sushi), an international food business; ScS Group plc, a U.K.-based furniture retailer; and Motorpoint Group plc., a U.K.-based omnichannel used car retailer.

== Personal life ==
Walden has five children and lives in Chicago.

Business positions
Preceded by Terry Duddy	Chief Executive of Home Retail Group; March 2014 -	Succeeded by Incumbent
Preceded by Terry Duddy	Managing Director of Argos; February 2012 - March 2014	Succeeded by
