= Nothing Is Impossible =

Nothing Is Impossible may refer to:

- "Nothing is Impossible", a song by Westlife from Coast to Coast
- Nothing Is Impossible (Planetshakers album), 2011 album by Planetshakers
- Nothing Is Impossible (Planetshakers song), 2011
- Nothing Is Impossible (Mariah Carey song), 2026
- Nothing Is Impossible (Planetshakers Kids album), 2013 album by Planetshakers Church
- 14 Peaks: Nothing Is Impossible, 2021 documentary film
- Nothing Is Impossible: Reflections on a New Life, a 2002 autobiographical book by Christopher Reeve

== See also ==
- Impossible is nothing (disambiguation)
- Nada es Imposible (disambiguation)
