= Rain (Planetshakers album) =

Live album by Planetshakers
- Released: 6 September 2019
- Recorded: 2019
- Venue: John Cain Arena, Melbourne, Australia Smart Araneta Coliseum, Quezon City, Philippines Sunway Pyramid Convention Centre, Kuala Lumpur, Malaysia
- Genre: Worship
- Length: 88:17
- Label: Planetshakers Ministries International, Venture3Media
- Producer: Joth Hunt

Planetshakers chronology
Heaven on Earth (2018)	Rain (2019)	It's Christmas (2019)

Singles from Planetshakers
- 1. "Only Way" Released: March 8, 2019

Rain is a live album by contemporary worship band Planetshakers, recorded during the annual Planetshakers Conference in Melbourne, the Philippines, and Malaysia. Planetshakers Ministries International and Venture3Media released the album on 6 September 2019. The album also includes all the songs from Rain, Part 1 (released in January), Rain, Part 2 (released in April) and Rain, Part 3 (released in August). They worked with Joth Hunt in the production of this album.

== Critical reception ==
Professional ratings
Review scores
Source	Rating
Kristiya Know	4/5 stars

Marc Daniel Rivera, specifying in a four star review for Kristiya Know, replies, "Overall, Rain does not disappoint. While the majority of the tracks tend to sound a little bit generic, the entire album is very singable and congregation-friendly. The artistry and collective effort behind this project are wonderfully manifested throughout the album. Above all, Rain represents the heartbeat and cry of a generation longing for more of God."

== Track listing ==
No.	Title	Writer(s)	Length
1.	"Only Way" (live)	Joth Hunt / Samantha Evans	4:33
2.	"My Reason" (live)	Andy Harrison / Joth Hunt	3:28
3.	"Fall On Me" (live)	Joth Hunt	4:16
4.	"Rain Your Glory Down" (live)	Andy Harrison / BJ Pridham / Joth Hunt / Sam Evans	9:07
5.	"God Is on the Throne" (live)	Joth Hunt	7:52
6.	"Right Now" (live)	BJ Pridham / Joth Hunt	9:01
7.	"I Choose You" (live)	Joth Hunt	3:46
8.	"I Lift Your Name Up" (live)	Joth Hunt	3:35
9.	"All Around" (live)	BJ Pridham / Andy Harrison / Joth Hunt	4:07
10.	"Take Your Place" (live)	Andy Harrison / Joth Hunt / Sam Evans	9:04
11.	"Fire Fall" (live)	Andy Harrison / Joth Hunt	10:34
12.	"Anything Can Happen" (live)	Andy Harrison / Sam Evans / Joth Hunt	8:14
13.	"God Is on the Throne" (studio)	Joth Hunt	3:37
14.	"I Lift Your Name Up" (80's Remix)	Joth Hunt	3:21
15.	"Fall On Me" (Heavy Remix)	Joth Hunt	3:40
Total length:			88:17

== Singles ==
Year	Single	Peak chart positions
Year	Single	US Christian Airplay
2019	"Only Way"	48
