= Heaven on Earth, Part 3 =

EP by Planetshakers
- Released: 19 October 2018
- Recorded: April – May 2018
- Length: 26:32
- Label: Planetshakers Ministries International, Venture3Media
- Producer: Joth Hunt

Planetshakers chronology
| Heaven on Earth, Part 2 (2018) | Heaven on Earth, Part 3 (2018) | Heaven on Earth (2018) |

Heaven on Earth, Part 3 is a live EP from Planetshakers. This album was released on 9 August 2018 by Planetshakers Ministries International and Venture3Media.

== Critical reception ==
Professional ratings
Review scores
| Source | Rating |
|---|---|
| Jesus Freak Hideout | 3/5 stars |

Rating the album three stars for Jesus Freak Hideout, Bert Gangl wrote, "Following the first two EPs in the series, Heaven on Earth - Part Three starts off promisingly with the driving, melodic EDM title cut. The lilting staccato rhythms and feather-light feel of "Nothing Is Impossible" render it a likewise winning proposition. The remainder of the run time, however, is given over to stereotypical radio-ready tracks like "Rivers" and "Overcome It All," and the equally less than stellar "Through It All" remix, the latter of whose overuse of vocal effects winds up more gratuitous than engaging." Jake Frederick by New Release Today summarised that Heaven On Earth, Pt. 3 "completes the trilogy of EPs leading up to the release of the full album, and it closes on a strong note with an album worth waiting for."

== Track listing ==
| No. | Title | Length |
|---|---|---|
| 1. | "Heaven on Earth" (live) | 4:15 |
| 2. | "Overcome It All" (live) | 5:43 |
| 3. | "Rivers" (live) | 7:43 |
| 4. | "Through It All" (remix) | 4:33 |
| 5. | "Nothing Is Impossible" (EDM remix) | 4:18 |
| Total length: | | 26:32 |
