= Glory, Part Two =

EP by Planetshakers
- Released: 3 April 2020
- Recorded: 2020
- Genre: Worship
- Length: 25:20
- Label: Planetshakers Ministries International, Venture3Media
- Producer: Joth Hunt

Planetshakers chronology
Glory, Part One (2020)	Glory, Part Two (2020)	Over It All (2020)

Glory, Part Two is a live EP from contemporary worship band Planetshakers. Recorded during a "Praise Party" at SMART Araneta Coliseum in Manila/Quezon City, Philippines, it was released on 3 April 2020 by Planetshakers Ministries International and Venture3Media.

== Critical reception ==
Professional ratings
Review scores
Source	Rating
Jesus Freak Hideout	3/5 stars

Awarding the album three out of five stars from Jesus Freak Hideout, reviewer Bert Gangl stated, "Glory, Part two does shake up the well-worn formula ever so slightly, as evidenced by the alternating bass, drum and guitar solos found on 'So Good' and what could broadly be labeled as the rock-oriented inclinations of 'Living Louder.'"

Jasmin Patterson, from New Release Today says, "Planetshakers has always had an electric sound that demonstrates how worship can be fun, edgy, and spiritually engaging at the same time. That same style, infectious energy, and passion for God shine through on Glory, Pt. Two. The four-song EP covers a lot of ground as far as genres go, giving us a taste of pop/rock ("So Good"), ballads ("Encounter Song", "All"), and synth-pop ("Living Louder")".

Randy Cross from Worship Leader says, Planetshakers continues their reputation for writing songs for this generation to use as a heart cry to God, in our soundbite world, songs that are coming in at almost 6 minutes in length can be perceived as redundant to some.

== Track listing ==
Glory, Part two track listing
No.	Title	Length
1.	"Living Louder (Live)"	3:24
2.	"So Good (Live)"	5:15
3.	"Encounter Song (Live)"	10:47
4.	"All (Live)"	5:54
Total length:		25:20
