= Glory, Part One =

EP by Planetshakers
- Released: 10 January 2020
- Recorded: 2019
- Genre: Worship
- Length: 31:01
- Label: Planetshakers Ministries International, Venture3Media
- Producer: Joth Hunt

Planetshakers chronology
It's Christmas (2019)	Glory, Part One (2020)	Glory, Part Two (2020)

Singles from Planetshakers
- 1. "I Remember" Released: May 15, 2020

Glory, Part One is a live EP from Planetshakers. Recorded in Melbourne, Australia, at Planetshakers Church, it was released on 10 January 2020 by Planetshakers Ministries International and Venture3Media.

== Critical reception ==
Professional ratings
Review scores
Source	Rating
CCM Magazine	4.5/5 stars
Louder Than the Music	4/5 stars
365 Days of Inspiring Media	2/5 stars

Awarding the album four and half stars at CCM Magazine, Jaime Vaughn states, "'How I Praise,' starts the collection as a super fun and upbeat song that brings the listener into the excitement of God and it is hard not to smile while listening. The song that stirred this writer the most is 'Can’t Take My Eyes Off You.' The entire song is full of hidden jewels that one can take with them throughout the day. 'From glory to glory, from healing to healing, from freedom to freedom, as I see you, I am changed. From Breakthrough to breakthrough, there is nothing you can’t do. Oh Jesus, I love you as I see you and I am changed.'" In a four star review from Louder Than the Music, Jono Davies states, "What I found when I turned this EP on was the energy that smashed out of the speakers, for me 'How I Praise' is just full of creative energy, and the song 'Walls' has this creative modern pop sound that we have come to know from Planetshakers." Joshua Andre, specifying in a two star review for 365 Days of Inspiring Media, replies, "Glory Pt 1 is forgettable if I had to describe it in one word, which even though some tracks are competent, there still needs to be improvement and work."

== Track listing ==
Glory, Part One track listing
No.	Title	Length
1.	"How I Praise (Live)"	3:13
2.	"Walls (Live)"	4:42
3.	"I Remember (Live)"	10:44
4.	"Can't Take My Eyes Off You (Live)"	6:43
5.	"Overwhelmed (Live)"	5:41
Total length:		31:01
