= Legacy, Part 2: Passion =

Live album by Planetshakers
- Released: 14 July 2017
- Recorded: 2017
- Genre: Inspirational, contemporary Christian
- Length: 47:28
- Label: Planetshakers Ministries International, Integrity Music
- Producer: Joth Hunt

Planetshakers chronology
Legacy, Part. 1: Alive Again (2017)	Legacy, Part 2: Passion (2017)	Legacy (2017)

Legacy, Part 2: Passion is a live album from Planetshakers, recorded live during the 20th anniversary. Planetshakers Conference at Hisense Arena in Melbourne, Australia. Planetshakers Ministries International and Integrity Music released the album on 14 July 2017.

On 22 July 2017 the album secured the No. 46 spot on the ARIA Top 50 Chart. This was Planetshaker's sixth entry on ARIA's Top 50 Chart.

== Critical reception ==
Professional ratings
Review scores
Source	Rating
New Release Today	4/5 stars
The Christian Beat	4/5 stars
365 Days of Inspiring Media	4/5 stars

Giving the album four stars at New Release Today, Caitlin Lassiter says, "This EP is one of the most genuine-feeling expressions of praise I've heard in a long time. What it lacks in track length, it more than makes up for in lyrical depth, engaging vocals and powerful worship moments captured in their live setting".

Madeleine Dittmer, in a four star review for The Christian Beat, wrote: "Legacy Part 2: Passion, contains well written, produced, and played live worship tracks that provide the soundtrack for a full worship experience, from a dance party to a powerful time of prayer and praise. It is arguably one of Planetshaker's best, and it is definitely an album you’ll want to add to your collection".

Joshua Andre, in a four star review for 365 Days of Inspiring Media says, "Overall is an enjoyable EP that has definitely continues my reinvigorated interest for Planetshakers a bit more; this track list has certainly created momentum (no pun intended!), and given me new songs to sing out to Jesus during times of joy and hardship".

== Track listing ==
No.	Title	Writer(s)	Length
1.	"Passion" (live in Melbourne)	Joth Hunt / Samantha Evans / BJ Pridham	3:58
2.	"Prophesy" (live in Melbourne)	Andy Harrison	4:21
3.	"We Speak Life" (live in Melbourne)	Joth Hunt	8:34
4.	"You Call Me Beautiful" (live in Melbourne)	Mitch Wong	9:41
5.	"Passion"	Joth Hunt / Sam Evans / BJ Pridham	4:02
6.	"Prophesy"	Andy Harrison	4:21
7.	"We Speak Life"	Joth Hunt	7:11
8.	"You Call Me Beautiful"	Mitch Wong	6:40
Total length:			47:28

== Personnel ==
- Joth Hunt – singer
- Samantha Evans – singer
- Rudy Nikkerud – singer
- Chelsi Nikkerud – singer
- BJ Pridham – singer
- Natalie Ruiz – singer
- Steven Sowden – singer
- Natasha Tripodi – singer
- Uli Flores – singer
- Aimee Evans – singer
- Josh Ham – bass guitar
- Andy Harrison – drums
- Mitch Wong – keyboards
- Scott Lim – keyboards

== Charts ==
Legacy, Part 2: Passion debuted at #3 on the iTunes Christian and Gospel Charts.

Chart (2017)	Peak position
Australian Albums (ARIA)	46
