= This Is Our Time: Live =

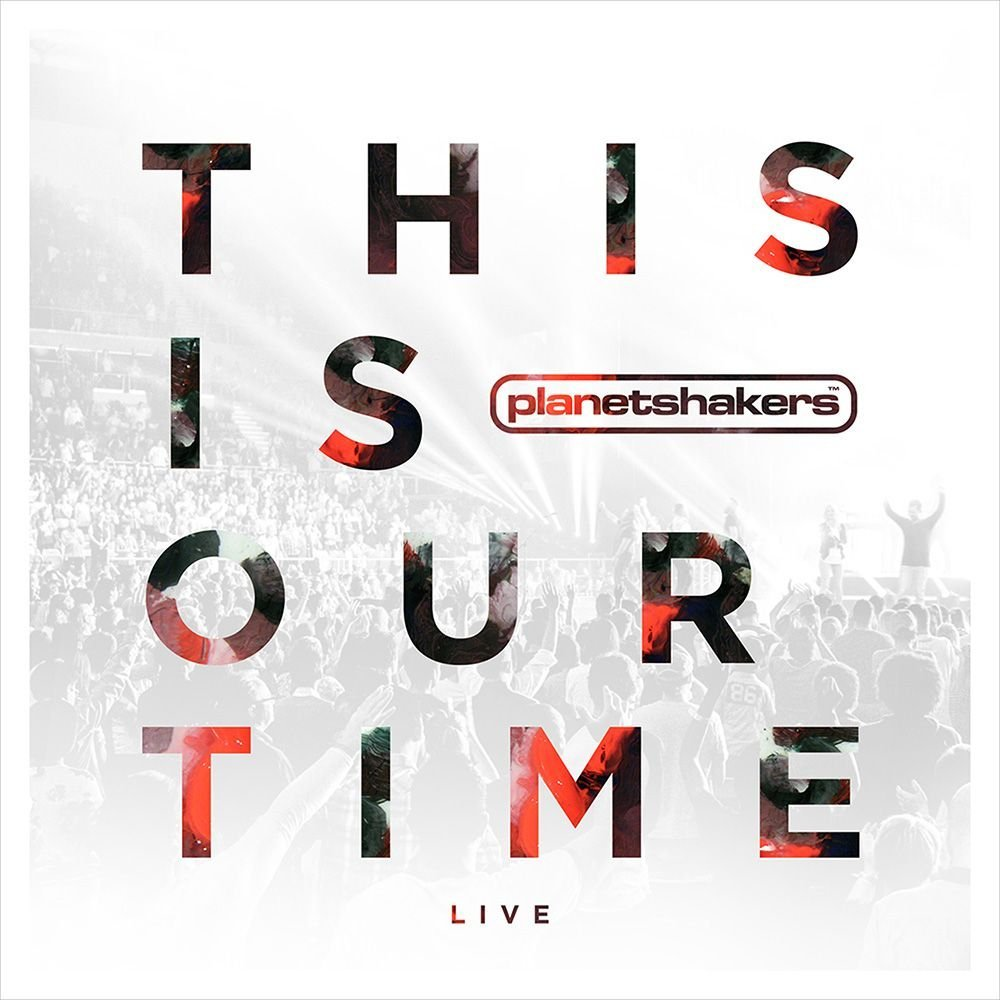

Live album by Planetshakers
- Released: October 21, 2014
- Recorded: 2014
- Venue: Hisense Arena, Melbourne, Australia
- Genre: Worship
- Length: 75:33
- Label: Planetshakers Ministries International, Integrity Music
- Producer: Joth Hunt

Planetshakers chronology
Nada Es Imposible (2014)	This Is Our Time: Live (2014)	Outback Worship Sessions (2015)

This Is Our Time: Live is a live album from Planetshakers recorded live during the Awakening 2014 conference held April 14–17, 2014 in Melbourne, Australia. Planetshakers Ministries International and Integrity Music released the album on October 21, 2014. They worked with Joth Hunt in the production of this album. The video of the song "This is Our Time" was nominated for the Dove Award Long Form Video of The Year 2014.

== Critical reception ==
Professional ratings
Review scores
Source	Rating
365 Days of Inspiring Media	3.5/5 stars
CCM Magazine	3/5 stars
Cross Rhythms	6/10 squares
Jesus Freak Hideout	3/5 stars
Jesus Wired	7/10 stars
Louder Than the Music	4.5/5 stars
New Release Today	4/5 stars
Worship Leader	4/5 stars

Awarding the album three stars at CCM Magazine, Matt Conner states, the album "is a pulsing, joyful set steeped in dance-hall style and substance. Therein lies the draw and drawbacks for This Is Our Time." Steve Reed, giving the album four stars from Worship Leader, writes, "Everything is then coupled together with their signature pronounced gang vocals to back up various talented leaders. Themes are centrally focused on freedom, victory, miracles, and a passion for God's presence." Rating the album three stars for Jesus Freak Hideout, Alex Caldwell says, "This Is Our Time does capture the energy and excitement of what must have been a very exciting evening of worship at the Planetshaker's gathering."

Caitlin Lassiter, indicating in a four star review by New Release Today, describes, "Lyrically, the album is a strong project from start to finish. Anthemic songs, powerful declarations of faith and congregation-friendly worship are just a few things the band does well, and they all shine through in a great way on this album." Assigning a six out of ten rating to the album at Cross Rhythms, Tony Cummings reports, "It starts off rather surprisingly considering their rather stereotypical stadium rock approach of old with a distinctly EDM flavour and the first three cuts including the anthemic title track have plenty of keyboard riffs and loud kick though the live atmosphere and rather bland vocals, featuring several female voices singing in unison, mean you won't be hearing these in clubland any time soon."

Signaling in a four star review from Louder Than the Music, Jono Davies responds, "'This Is Our Time' is an album about raising up people who are ready to fall in love with God and do His work in the world. If you want to be inspired and uplifted then this is the album for you." Joshua Andre, specifying in a three and a half star review for 365 Days of Inspiring Media, replies, "Overall an enjoyable album that has overall reinvigorated my interest for Planetshakers a bit more; this album achieved what it set out to do". Bestowing a seven out of ten rating upon the album at Jesus Wired, Maddy Agers recognizes, "Anyone with a love for worship music will enjoy this, but I will say that it is for those with a love for softer worship, and those who enjoy both male and female vocals throughout."

== Awards and accolades ==
The video of the song "This is Our Time" was nominated for the Dove Award Long Form Video of the Year 2014 at the 46th Annual GMA Dove Awards.

== Track listing ==
No.	Title	Writer(s)	Length
1.	"This Is Our Time"	Aimee Evans, Josh Ham, Andy Harrison, Steph Ling, Mitch Wong	3:48
2.	"Joy"	Joth Hunt	4:03
3.	"My Heart Is Alive"	Harrison, B.J. Pridham	3:48
4.	"Leave Me Astounded"	Pridham	6:58
5.	"Covered"	Israel Houghton, Hunt	7:55
6.	"Stronger Than a Thousand Seas"	Houghton, Wong	6:15
7.	"The Water Is Rising"	Samantha Evans, Harrison, Houghton, Hunt, Pridham	5:19
8.	"It's Your Love"	Hunt	4:05
9.	"Sing It Again"	Pridham	4:27
10.	"You"	Harrison	5:17
11.	"Holy"	Hunt, Chelsi Nikkerud, Natalie Ruiz	4:35
12.	"He Touched Me"	William J. Gaither	4:53
13.	"Your Presence"	Harrison	5:49
14.	"Look to You"	Hunt	3:48
15.	"Abba Father" (Studio Version)	Evans, Harrison, Hunt, Pridham	4:33
Total length:			75:38

== Chart performance ==
Chart (2014)	Peak position
US Heatseekers Albums (Billboard)	14
US Top Christian Albums (Billboard)	17
US Christian Album Sales (Billboard)	17
Australian Albums (ARIA)	30
New Zealand Albums (RMNZ)	36
US Billboard 200	61
