= Nada es Imposible =

Nada es Imposible may refer to:

- "Nada es Imposible" (song), a 1997 song by Ricky Martín
- Nada Es Imposible, a 2014 album by Planetshakers

== See also ==
- Nothing Is Impossible (disambiguation)
