= Nada Es Imposible =

2014 Spanish-language album by Australian band Planetshakers

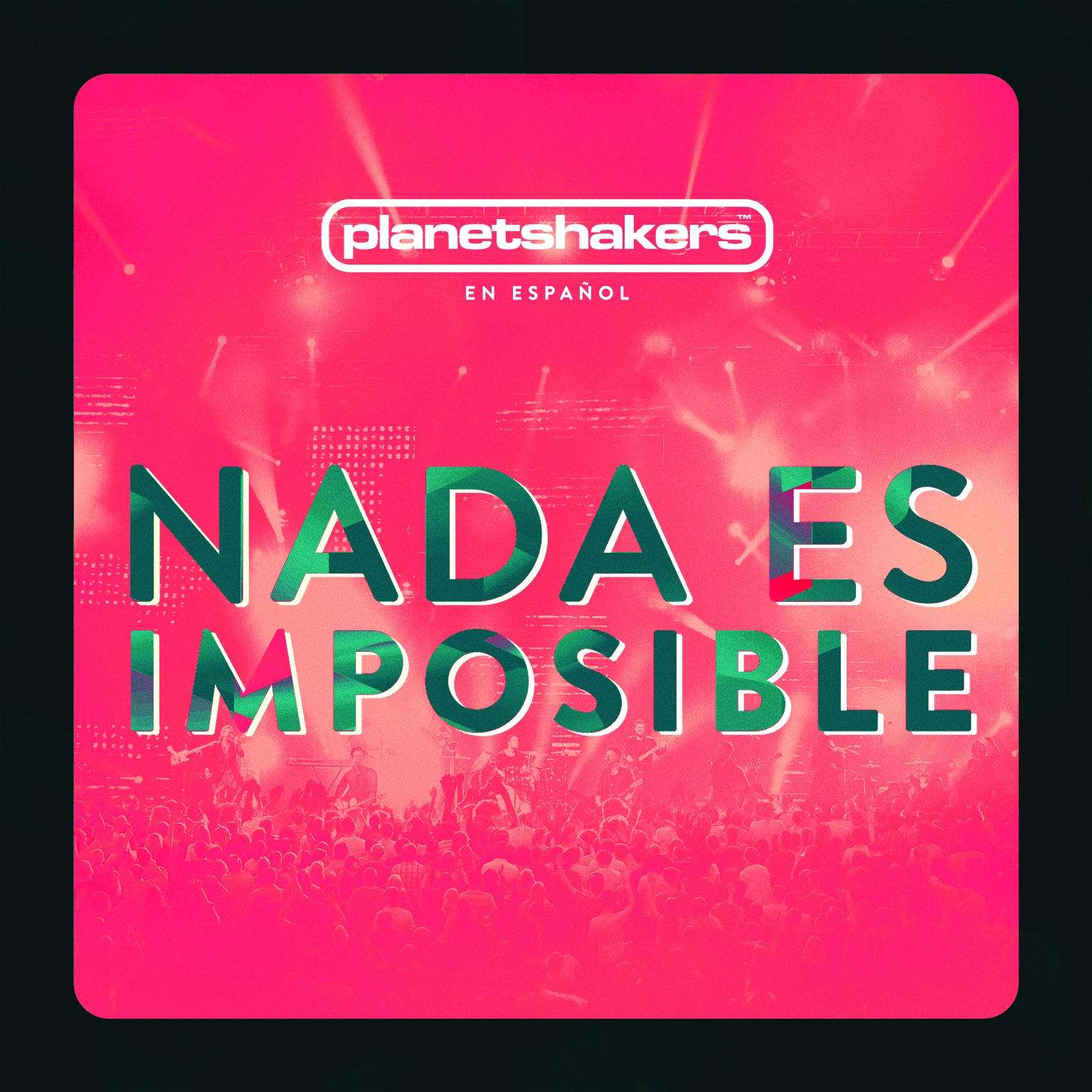

Studio album by Planetshakers
- Released: June 29, 2014
- Recorded: 2014
- Studios: Planetshakers Studios in Melbourne, Australia
- Genres: Worship; Latin Christian music
- Length: 50:00
- Language: Spanish
- Labels: Planetshakers Ministries International, Integrity Music
- Producer: Joth Hunt

Planetshakers chronology
Endless Praise: Live (2014)	Nada Es Imposible (2014)	This Is Our Time: Live (2014)

Planetshakers in Spanish chronology
Nada Es Imposible (2014)	Sé Quién Eres Tú (2016)

Singles from Nada Es Imposible
- 1. "Nada Es Imposible" Released: June 23, 2014

Nada Es Imposible is the first album in Spanish by Australian contemporary worship band Planetshakers. They worked with Joth Hunt in the production of this album. Nada Es Imposible in Spanish, was released by Planetshakers Ministries International and Integrity Music on June 29, 2014, the album debuted at No. 17 on the Billboard "Latin Pop Albums" chart. The album includes a selection of 11 songs by Planetshakers translated and recorded in Spanish featuring guest vocals from Lucía Parker on the title track.

== Release and promotion ==
The title track of the album, "Nada Es Imposible" (feat. Lucía Parker), was released on June 23, 2014 as the title track, when the pre-order of the album began. The album Nada Es Imposible in Spanish, was released by Planetshakers Ministries International and Integrity Music on June 29, 2014. Nada Es Imposible is the first album by Planetshakers to be recorded in Spanish.

== Critical reception ==
Professional ratings
Review scores
Source	Rating
Amazon.com	positive

A staff editor at Amazon.com gave the album a relatively positive review, writing, the album Nada Es Imposible is "Led by Russell and Sam Evans. Planetshakers has created a unique space in the worship community through energetic celebratory songs and passionate worship."

== Awards and accolades ==
This album has been nominated by the Arpa Awards (Mexico, 2014) in three categories: best group or duo album, album rock or hard rock and producer of 2014.

== Commercial performance ==
In the United States, Nada Es Imposible debuted at No. 17 on the Latin Pop Albums chart dated 19 July 2014 published by Billboard.

== Track listing ==
NOTE: These songs are Spanish-language translations of Planetshakers songs in English. The original English-language song is listed next to each title.

Nada Es Imposible
No.	Title	Writer(s)	Worship leader(s)	Length
1.	"Que La Alabanza Despierte (Let Praise Awaken)"	Andy Harrison / Joth Hunt	Joth Hunt	3:50
2.	"Por Siempre Te Alabaré (Endless Praise)"	Andy Harrison / Joth Hunt	Joth Hunt	3:59
3.	"Nada Es Imposible (feat. Lucía Parker) (Nothing Is Impossible)"	Joth Hunt	Joth Hunt / Lucía Parker	4:05
4.	"Levantando Las Manos (Put Your Hands Up)"	Joth Hunt	Rudy Nikkerud	3:21
5.	"El Himno (The Anthem)"	Joth Hunt / Henry Seeley / Liz Webber	Joth Hunt	6:11
6.	"Grande Es Tu Amor (Great Is Your Love)"	Joth Hunt / B.J. Pridham	Samantha Evans	6:46
7.	"Este Es El Día (This Is The Day)"	Andy Harrison / Joth Hunt / B.J. Pridham	B.J. Pridham	4:38
8.	"Estoy Asombrado (Leave Me Astounded)"	B.J. Pridham	Joth Hunt / Chelsi Nikkerud	5:40
9.	"Sin Límites (Limitless)"	Joth Hunt	Joth Hunt / Samantha Evans	3:26
10.	"Todo Mundo De Pie (Get Up)"	Andy Harrison / Joth Hunt	Rudy Nikkerud	3:59
11.	"Se Trata De Jesús (It's All About Jesus)"	Henry Seeley	Natalie Ruiz	3:42
Total length:				50:00

== Personnel ==
Adapted from AllMusic.

- Planetshakers – primary artist
- Jonathan Hunt – Worship leader, composer, A&R, mixing, producer
- Samantha Evans – Worship leader, executive producer
- Rudy Nikkerud – Worship leader
- Chelsi Nikkerud – Worship leader
- Brian "BJ" Pridham – Worship leader, composer
- Natalie Ruiz – Worship leader
- Lucía Parker – vocals, vocals producer, featured Artist, translation
- Andy Harrison – composer
- Henry Seeley – composer
- Liz Webber – composer
- Joshua Brown – Artist development
- Craig Dunnagan – Artist development
- Chico Gonzalez – Artist development
- Matthew Gray – Mastering
- Samuel Koh – artwork design
- Mike Webber – project coordinator
- Mike Pilmer – project coordinator
- C. Ryan Dunham – executive producer
- Russell Evans – executive producer

== Chart performance ==
Nada Es Imposible debuted at #14 on the US iTunes Latino Charts.

Chart (2014)	Peak position
US Latin Pop Albums (Billboard)	17
