= Outback Worship Sessions =

Studio album by Planetshakers
- Released: May 12, 2015
- Recorded: 2015
- Studio: Ed's in Franklin TN; Planetshakers Studios in Melbourne, Australia
- Genre: Worship
- Length: 48:50
- Label: Planetshakers Ministries International, Integrity Music
- Producer: Ed Cash

Planetshakers chronology
This Is Our Time: Live (2014)	Outback Worship Sessions (2015)	Lets Go (2015)

Outback Worship Sessions is a studio album from Planetshakers. Planetshakers Ministries International and Integrity Music released the album on May 12, 2015. They worked with Ed Cash, in the production of this album.

== Critical reception ==
Professional ratings
Review scores
Source	Rating
365 Days of Inspiring Media	4/5 stars
About.com	3.5/5 stars
CCM Magazine	4/5 stars
Christian Music Review	3.5/5 stars
Cross Rhythms	9/10 squares
Jesus Freak Hideout	3/5 stars
Louder Than the Music	4.5/5 stars
New Release Today	4/5 stars
PPCORN	4.1/5 stars
Worship Leader	4/5 stars

Awarding the album four stars at CCM Magazine, Rebekah Bell states, "the band chose to go in a soulful, stripped down direction." Jeremy Armstrong, giving the album four stars from Worship Leader, writes, "the result is a powerful collection of accessible, incredible congregational songs." Rating the album three and a half stars for About.com, Kim Jones describes, "Outback Worship Sessions has some songs that are intimate and draw you in so deeply that you feel like you're in the Throne Room itself -- just you, Jesus and the music...While some songs hit home stronger than others did, there is nothing here that sounds like it's by rote." Christopher Cason, signaling in a nine out of ten review at Cross Rhythms, replies, "Overall the album is inspirational and uplifting with some great new worship songs."

Kevin Davis, indicating in a four star review by New Release Today, recognizes, "Outback Worship Sessions is a truly anointed set of songs for the Church, expressing a longing for Jesus." Specifying in a 4.1 star review at PPCORN, Jessica Morris replies, "Carrying the electricity of Planetshakers most beloved songs but delivered with a simplicity and richness many bands strive for, the Outback Worship Sessions is a carefully crafted album that will usher in a new generation of fans." Alex Caldwell, signaling in a three star review for Jesus Freak Hideout, responds, "Outback Worship Sessions is a collection of worship songs that has its really good moments, its dull ones and its substandard ones in almost equal measure."

Giving the album a four and a half star review from Louder Than the Music, Jono Davies says, "If you are looking for strong worship songs and have never heard of Planetshakers, then this sort of Greatest Hits album might be the perfect starting place." Joshua Andre, awarding the album four stars at 365 Days of Inspiring Media, states, "Overall an enjoyable album that has overall reinvigorated my interest for Planetshakers a bit more; Outback Worship Sessions achieved what it set out to do, and that is to share Jesus to the world using the methods and means that today’s culture understands and loves." Rating the album a three and a half stars by Christian Music Review, Kelly Meade writes, "Outback Worship Sessions gives listeners an album full of pure praise."

== Track listing ==
No.	Title	Writer(s)	Worship leader(s)	Length
1.	"Like a Fire"	Joth Hunt	Aimee Evans	4:27
2.	"Spirit of God"	Ed Cash, B.J. Pridham	B.J. Pridham	4:39
3.	"Leave Me Astounded"	Pridham	Aimee Evans	5:30
4.	"My Soul Longs for Jesus"	Cash	Samantha Evans	4:18
5.	"Endless Praise"	Andy Harrison, Hunt	Joth Hunt	3:44
6.	"Nothing Is Impossible"	Hunt	Joth Hunt	4:10
7.	"Covered"	Israel Houghton, Hunt	B.J. Pridham	4:17
8.	"Father"	Cash, Pridham	Aimee Evans	4:10
9.	"Made for Worship"	Harrison, Pridham	Aimee Evans	5:21
10.	"This Is the Day"	Harrison, Hunt, Pridham	Aimee Evans	4:37
11.	"This Is Our Time"	Aimee Evans, Josh Ham, Harrison, Steph Ling, Mitch Wong	B.J. Pridham	3:37
Total length:				48:50

== Chart performance ==
Chart (2015)	Peak position
Australian Independent Albums (AIR)	4
US Top Christian Albums (Billboard)	44
US Christian Album Sales (Billboard)	44
