= It's Christmas (Planetshakers album) =

Studio album by Planetshakers
- Released: 29 November 2019
- Recorded: 2017–2019
- Studio: Planetshakers Studios in Melbourne, Australia
- Genre: Worship; Christmas
- Length: 42:00
- Label: Planetshakers Ministries International, Venture3Media
- Producer: Joth Hunt

Planetshakers chronology
Rain (2019)	It's Christmas (2019)	Over It All (2020)

Planetshakers Christmas albums chronology
Christmas Vol. 2 (2018)	It's Christmas (2019)	It's Christmas Live (2020)

It's Christmas is the first studio Christmas album from Australian worship band Planetshakers. Planetshakers Ministries International and Venture3Media released the album on 29 November 2019. This album includes the Christmas releases of EPs Christmas Vol. 1 (2017) and Christmas Vol. 2 (2018).

== Critical reception ==
Professional ratings
Review scores
Source	Rating
CCM Magazine	4/5 stars
One Man In The Middle	6.9/10 stars

Awarding the album four stars at CCM Magazine, Jaime Vaughn states, "The title track 'It’s Christmas' is a festive pop sound that will help you get right into the Christmas spirit with lyrics 'Can you feel it in the air / Joy is everywhere, it’s Christmas / Everything is shining bright / Oh what a glorious night, it’s Christmas.' This album also blends in a beautiful jazz ballad of 'All Glory' to bring your heart to reflect on the true meaning of Christmas. This album gives the entire family a song to fall in love with no matter what their favorite musical genre may be." Rating the album 6.9 stars by One Man In The Middle, Rob Allwright states, "Other than these tracks you will find a couple of other original tracks from the band on the album previously featured. I do think that this is an album that is trying hard to be everything for people and I know we don't live in little boxes for our musical tastes. There are some great tracks here and if you don't own either of the previous EPs then this is worth picking up."

== Track listing ==
It's Christmas
No.	Title	Writer(s)	Worship leader(s)	Length
1.	"Angels We Have Heard On High"	Joth Hunt	Joth Hunt / Kemara Fuimaono	3:15
2.	"Joy To The World"	George Frederic Handel / Isaac Watts / Joth Hunt	Andy Harrison	2:44
3.	"It's Christmas"	Joth Hunt / Samantha Evans	Joth Hunt	3:39
4.	"The First Noel"	Joth Hunt / Rachel Vatucicila	Kemara Fuimaono / Rachel Vatucicila	3:15
5.	"Silent Night"	Franz Xaver Gruber / John Freeman Young / Joseph Mohr / Joth Hunt	Chelsi Nikkerud / Joth Hunt	3:47
6.	"All Glory"	Joth Hunt	Joth Hunt	5:05
7.	"Hark"	Charles Wesley / Felix Mendelssohn / Joth Hunt	Joth Hunt	3:12
8.	"O Holy Night"	Adolphe Charles Adam / John S. Dwight / Joth Hunt	Joth Hunt	5:56
9.	"The Prayer"	David Foster / Carole Bayer Sager / Alberto Testa / Tony Renis	Natalie Ruiz / Steve Sowden	4:03
10.	"Light Of The World"	Joth Hunt	Rudy Nikkerud / Joe Vatucicila	3:17
11.	"O Come All Ye Faithful"	Joth Hunt / C. Frederick Oakeley / John Francis Wade	Chelsi Nikkerud / Natalie Ruiz / Joth Hunt	3:43
Total length:				42:00

== Personnel ==
Adapted from AllMusic.

- Planetshakers – Primary artist
- Joth Hunt – Arranger, chant, composer, guitars, keyboards, mixing, producer, programming, vocals
- Samantha Evans – Worship leader, vocals, executive producer
- Rudy Nikkerud – Vocals
- Chelsi Nikkerud – Vocals
- Steve Sowden – Vocals
- Natalie Ruiz – Vocals
- Joe Vatucicila – Vocals
- Rachel Vatucicila – Vocals
- Kemara Fuimaono – Vocals
- Andy Harrison – Vocals, drums
- Josh Ham – Bass
- Joe Carra – Mastering
- Joshua Brown – A&R, Artist development
- Daryl Chia – Artwork
- Rachel McCarthy – Artwork
- John F. Wade – Arranger, composer
- Russell Evans – Worship Leader, executive producer
- Steve Nicolle – Executive producer

== It's Christmas Live ==
It's Christmas Live

Live album by Planetshakers
- Released: November 27, 2020
- Recorded: 2019
- Venue: Planetshakers Church
- Genre: Worship; Christmas
- Length: 44:00
- Label: Planetshakers Ministries International, Venture3Media
- Producer: Joth Hunt

Planetshakers chronology
Over It All (2020)	It's Christmas Live (2020)	Revival (2021)

Planetshakers Christmas albums chronology
It's Christmas (2019)	It's Christmas Live (2020)

It's Christmas Live is Planetshakers' first live Christmas album. Planetshakers Ministries International and Venture3Media released the album on 27 November 2020. This live album is the studio version It's Christmas was released last year. This album was recorded live in front of a packed auditorium at Planetshakers Church before the pandemic lockdowns, the full production recording and companion video was produced, directed and mixed by Joth Hunt at Planetshakers Studios. The album is led by Hunt and worship leaders Rudy Nikkerud, Chelsi Nikkerud, Natalie Ruiz, Joe Vatucicila, Rachel Vatucicila, Kemara Fuimaono and Steve Sowden. The recording also features a 59-voice choir and multiple drum, guitar, bass and keyboard musicians.

== Track listing ==
It's Christmas: Live
No.	Title	Writer(s)	Worship leader(s)	Length
1.	"Angels We Have Heard On High (Live)"	Joth Hunt	Joth Hunt / Kemara Fuimaono	3:11
2.	"Joy To The World (Live)"	George Frederic Handel / Isaac Watts / Joth Hunt	Rudy Nikkerud	2:43
3.	"It's Christmas (Live)"	Joth Hunt / Samantha Evans	Joth Hunt / Natalie Ruiz	3:33
4.	"The First Noel (Live)"	Joth Hunt / Rachel Vatucicila	Kemara Fuimaono / Rachel Vatucicila	3:04
5.	"Silent Night (Live)"	Franz Xaver Gruber / John Freeman Young / Joseph Mohr / Joth Hunt	Chelsi Nikkerud / Joth Hunt	3:44
6.	"All Glory (Live)"	Joth Hunt	Joth Hunt	5:06
7.	"Hark (Live)"	Charles Wesley / Felix Mendelssohn / Joth Hunt	Chelsi Nikkerud	3:13
8.	"O Holy Night (Live)"	Adolphe Charles Adam / John S. Dwight / Joth Hunt	Joth Hunt	7:15
9.	"Light Of The World (Live)"	Joth Hunt	Rudy Nikkerud / Joe Vatucicila	3:20
10.	"The Prayer (Live)"	David Foster / Carole Bayer Sager / Alberto Testa / Tony Renis	Natalie Ruiz / Steve Sowden	4:03
11.	"O Come All Ye Faithful (Live)"	Joth Hunt / C. Frederick Oakeley / John Francis Wade	Joth Hunt / Chelsi Nikkerud / Natalie Ruiz	4:27
Total length:				44:00

== Personnel ==
Adapted from AllMusic.

- Adolphe Adam – Arranger, Composer
- Tabetha Aguilera – Choir/Chorus
- Ibrahim Ahmed – Drums
- Brendan Allen – Stage Manager
- Josiah Ang – Choir/Chorus
- Elizabeth Arcangel – Choir/Chorus
- San Awng – Choir/Chorus
- Melissa Bell – Monitors
- Angela Bermudez – Choir/Chorus
- Jennifer Bourke – Project Coordinator
- Joshua Brown – A&R, Artist Development
- Joe Carra – Mastering
- Olivia Chambers – Stage Design
- Alan Chan – Choir/Chorus
- Stella Chandra – Choir/Chorus
- Brian Cheng – Camera Assistant
- Nicole Chew – Camera Assistant
- Christel Chia – Camera Operator, Editing, Graphics
- Daryl Chia – Artwork, Camera Operator, Design, Editing, Graphics
- Nicole Harsono Chia – Choir/Chorus
- Desmond Chong – Stage Design
- Nikita Christopher – Choir/Chorus
- Moses Chuas – Stage Design
- Selina Chuo – Choir/Chorus
- Lucas Clayton – Stage Design
- Josh Creek – Stage Design
- Ellen Desear – Choir/Chorus
- John S. Dwight – Arranger, Composer
- Mohammad Eakhrzadeh – Stage Design
- Micaela Elliott – Camera Operator, Editing, Graphics
- Jono Evans – Drums
- Russell Evans – Executive Producer
- Sam Evans – Composer, Executive Producer
- Justus Field – Choir/Chorus
- Felix Filbert – Choir/Chorus
- Feilicia Fiona – Choir/Chorus
- Crystal Forrester – Choir/Chorus
- David Foster – Arranger, Composer
- Kemara Fuimaono – Vocals
- Sandhi Garcia – Stage Design
- Corey Glazebrook – Choir/Chorus
- Rhema Goruck – Choir/Chorus
- Carol Ham – Stage Design
- Josh Ham – Bass
- Aaron Hammill – Choir/Chorus
- Alanna Hammill – Choir/Chorus
- Andy Harrison – Drums
- Alyssa Heilborn – Stage Design
- Alvin Hiew – Assistant, Stage Design
- Esther Hkawn – Choir/Chorus
- Ben Hogarth – Stage Design
- Florence Huang – Stage Design
- Joth Hunt – Adaptation, Arranger, Artwork, Composer, Design, Mixing, Producer, Project Coordinator, Video Director, Vocals
- Racheal Hunt – Choir/Chorus
- Precious Mae Hurtado – Choir/Chorus
- Lorna Kakono – Choir/Chorus
- Megan Kappelhoff – Choir/Chorus
- Jansen Karim – Choir/Chorus
- Terry Kay – Monitor Engineer
- Zach Kellock – Assistant Engineer
- Angie Kim – Monitors, Stage Design
- Ejuen Lee – Choir/Chorus
- Ernest Lew – Photography
- Hannah Limsiaco – Choir/Chorus
- Ada Liu – Stage Design
- Faith Lo – Assistant, Stage Design
- William Loo – Stage Design
- Sherlyn Marvella – Stage Design
- Bryan Mason – Choir/Chorus
- Priscilla Mery – Choir/Chorus
- Sophie Mildenhall – Choir/Chorus
- Selina Mok – Guitar (Acoustic)
- Sharon Monk – Choir/Chorus
- Lupiya Mujala – Stage Design
- Hannah Myszka – Choir/Chorus
- Anotidaishe Naomi – Choir/Chorus
- Neil Castro – Choir/Chorus
- Steph Ng – Stage Design
- Steve Nicolle – Executive Producer
- Rudy Nikkerud – Vocals
- Chelsi Nikkerud – Vocals
- Jack Norris – Choir/Chorus
- Shona Oavey – Choir/Chorus
- Maila Ocampo-Reyes – Choir/Chorus
- Fadi Odeesh – Choir/Chorus
- Janelle Oh – Choir/Chorus
- Terence Ong – Engineer, Live Recording, Production Manager
- Christian John Phillips – Camera Operator
- Remah Picimi – Choir/Chorus
- Dave Pike – Lighting
- Mike Pilmer – Camera Operator
- Planetshakers – Primary Artist
- Sheridan Pover – Choir/Chorus
- Sarah Rayners – Choir/Chorus
- Tony Renis – Arranger, Composer
- Javiera Rivas – Choir/Chorus
- Natalie Ruiz – Vocals
- Carole Bayer Sager – Arranger, Composer
- Ben Salvador – Bass
- Lorraine Salvador – Choir/Chorus
- Elysabeth Santoso – Choir/Chorus
- Anabella Secchiaro – Choir/Chorus
- Virtuous Selere – Choir/Chorus
- Felicity Shalless – Stage Design
- Belinda Simmons – Choir/Chorus
- Ryan Smith – Camera Operator, Editing, Graphics
- Lloyd Smyth – Keyboards
- Justin Soh – Photography
- Steve Sowden – Vocals
- Rachel Sparkes –Choir/Chorus
- Zach Spinks – Assistant Engineer
- Brandon Stafford – Choir/Chorus
- Kh Tah – Guitar (Acoustic), Guitars
- Sarah-Joy Tan – Choir/Chorus
- Zoe Tang - Choir/Chorus
- Alberto Testa – Arranger, Composer
- Will Thomas – Stage Design
- Caroline Tjung – Choir/Chorus
- Traditional – Composer
- Ashley Turner – Choir/Chorus
- Joe Vatucicila – Vocals
- Rachel Vatucicila – Arranger, Vocals
- Marce Vega – Choir/Chorus
- John F. Wade – Arranger, Composer
- Isaac Watts – Composer
- Michael Wendt – Camera Operator
- Bellivia Wijaya – Choir/Chorus
- Julian Williams – Lighting Assistant
- Matt Wong – Production Design, Production Manager, Technical Director
- Wei Xiong Yap – Photography
- Sue Lynn Grace Yee – Choir/Chorus
- Vinnie Yeoh – Choir/Chorus
- Jonathan Yew-Cheong – Choir/Chorus
- Lok Yuong Yong – Stage Design
- Isaac Younan – Choir/Chorus
