= Endless Praise =

2014 song by Planetshakers

Single by Planetshakers

from the album Endless Praise: Live
- Released: March 9, 2014
- Recorded: 2013
- Genre: Contemporary worship music
- Length: 4:06
- Label: Planetshakers Ministries International, Integrity
- Songwriter: Joth Hunt; Andy Harrison
- Producer: Joth Hunt

Planetshakers singles chronology
"The Anthem" (2012)	"Endless Praise" (2014)	"Covered" (2014)

Music video
- "Endless Praise" on YouTube

"Endless Praise" is a song by Australian contemporary worship band Planetshakers. It was released on March 9, 2014, as the lead single from their live album, Endless Praise: Live (2014). The song also appeared on the album Nada Es Imposible (2014), and on the album Outback Worship Sessions. The song was written by Joth Hunt and Andy Harrison.

== Composition and genre ==
The song was written by Joth Hunt and Andy Harrison.

In the 2014, Planetshakers released the song Endless Praise, the song was recorded live in Hisense Arena, Melbourne, Australia, Joth Hunt leads the song, appears on the album Endless Praise: Live (2014).

In the 2014, Planetshakers released the song Por Siempre Te Alabaré, the song was recorded in Planetshakers Studio, Joth Hunt leads the song, appears on the album Nada Es Imposible (2014), the band's first album in Spanish.

In the 2015, Planetshakers released the song Endless Praise in a pop-style, songwriter Joth Hunt leads the song, appears on the album Outback Worship Sessions.

== Music videos ==
The official music video for the song was released on March 4, 2014 and has garnered over 26 million views as of April 2021.

== Awards and accolades ==
The video of the song Endless Praise was nominated for Dove Award Long Form Video of The Year 2014 at the 45th Annual GMA Dove Awards.

== Covers and renditions ==
Endless Praise has been translated and interpreted in many evangelical churches around the world. This song has been covered by a number of Christian music artists including: Lakewood Church, El Lugar de Su Presencia, and Ingrid Rosario among other artists.

On November 02, 2015, Banda Graça released the song "Endless Praise" in Portuguese from the album Quatro Cantos (2015).

On August 10, 2016, Rodney Howard-Browne released the song "Endless Praise" from the album Live Winter Campmeeting '16 (2016), and the album God Is Here (2018).

On February 28, 2017, The Recording Collective released the song "Endless Praise" from the album Gospel Vol. 2: Every Praise (2017).

On February 23, 2018, Rodolfo Frass released the song "Endless Praise" in Portuguese.

On July 31, 2020, Funky Worship released the song "Endless Praise" from the album Two (2020).
