= Heal Our Land =

Live album by Planetshakers
- Released: April 10, 2012
- Recorded: 2011
- Venue: Hisense Arena, Melbourne, Australia
- Genre: Worship
- Length: 68:40
- Label: Planetshakers Ministries International, Integrity, Columbia
- Producer: Joth Hunt

Planetshakers chronology
Nothing Is Impossible (2010)	Heal Our Land (2012)	Limitless (2013)

Heal Our Land is a live album from the contemporary worship band Planetshakers. Planetshakers Ministries International, Integrity and Columbia released the album on April 10, 2012. The album was recorded in the Hisense Arena, Melbourne, Australia.

== Critical reception ==
Professional ratings
Review scores
Source	Rating
Cross Rhythms	9/10 squares
Jesus Freak Hideout	1/5 stars
Indie Vision Music	1/5 stars
Amazon.com	positive

Stephen Luff, in a nine out of ten review from Cross Rhythms, describes the album as "infectious worship with a driving beat and an anthem audience response. An outstanding worship package."

Rating the album one stars for Jesus Freak Hideout, Scott Fryberger says, "These are the songs that, for the people in attendance for this recording, provided the more intimate moments of worship."

In a one star review from Indie Vision Music, Jonathan Andre states, "Despite the worshipful nature of the music, it becomes very disheartening with bands like this to listen as a music fan and literally wonder which of the songs are covers and which are originals."

== Track listing ==
No.	Title	Writer(s)	Length
1.	"Supernatural"	Joth Hunt	4:06
2.	"Good To Me"	Joth Hunt	3:58
3.	"Do It Again"	Joth Hunt	4:21
4.	"Heal Our Land"	Brian "Bj" Pridham	9:27
5.	"Strength Of My Life"	Joth Hunt	6:42
6.	"Hold On To Me"	Joth Hunt	3:11
7.	"Hallelujah To The Lord"	Samantha Evans / Joth Hunt	6:49
8.	"You Have It All"	Joth Hunt	6:37
9.	"Power"	Joth Hunt	3:42
10.	"It's You"	Joth Hunt	3:39
11.	"No One Like You"	Joth Hunt	8:34
12.	"Running To You"	Sam Evans / Joth Hunt	7:28
Total length:			68:40

== Chart performance ==
Chart (2012)	Peak position
US Christian Albums (Billboard)	72
