= Covered (song) =

Single by Planetshakers and Israel & New Breed

from the album This Is Our Time: Live
- Released: October 21, 2014
- Recorded: April 14, 2014
- Venue: Hisense Arena, Melbourne, Australia
- Genre: Worship
- Length: 7:55
- Label: Planetshakers Ministries International; Integrity Music; RCA Inspiration
- Songwriter: Joth Hunt; Israel Houghton
- Producers: Joth Hunt, Aaron Lindsey and Kevin Camp

Planetshakers singles chronology
"Endless Praise" (2014)	"Covered" (2014)	"I Know Who You Are" (2016)

Music videos
- "Covered" on YouTube
- "COVERED ACOUSTIC SESSION" on YouTube

"Covered" is a song performed by Planetshakers and Israel & New Breed. Planetshakers released the song as the lead single from live album This Is Our Time: Live (2014) on October 21, 2014, as well as the Israel & New Breed live album Covered: Alive in Asia (2015) on July 24, 2015. The song also appeared on the album on the Planetshakers Outback Worship Sessions (2015) and also appeared on the Spanish album Eres Mi Todo as the song Me Cubres by Job González. The song was written by Joth Hunt and Israel Houghton.

== Composition and genre ==
"Covered" by Planetshakers is composed in the key of B with a tempo of 85 beats per minute and a musical time signature of 6/8. "Covered" by Israel & New Breed is composed in the key of B with a tempo of 87 beats per minute and a musical time signature of 6/8.

The song was written by Joth Hunt and Israel Houghton.

In 2014, Planetshakers released the song Covered, the song was recorded live during the Awakening 2014 conference held April 14–17, 2014 in Melbourne, Australia.

In 2014, Israel & New Breed released the song Covered, the song was recorded in studio with style Gospel for (Radio Edit) also recorded the live version that appears on the album with the same title Covered released in 2015.

In 2015, Planetshakers released the song Covered, this song was recorded in studio with style Pop Acoustic for the album Outback Worship Sessions.

== Commercial performance ==
Covered on the Digital Song Sales chart on October 31, 2014, the song debuted at No. 3.

== Music videos ==
On October 23, 2014, Planetshakers released the live music video of "Covered" on YouTube channel and has garnered over 2 million views as of June 2021. Planetshakers also released a music video of Covered in an acoustic session on October 23, 2014.

== Covers and renditions ==
Covered has been translated and interpreted in many evangelical churches around the world. This song has been covered by a number of Christian music artists.

Israel Houghton featuring Job González recorded the song "Me Cubres" (Covered) in Spanish for the album Eres Mi Todo released on February 15, 2016.

Cindy Cruse-Ratcliff also released the song (Covered) on October 26, 2016.

== Charts ==
Chart (2014)	Peak position
US Gospel Digital Song Sales (Billboard)	3
