= Impossible is nothing =

Impossible is Nothing may refer to:

- A commercial slogan by sports apparel manufacturer Adidas
- Impossible Is Nothing (video résumé), an inadvertently humorous video by internet phenomenon Aleksey Vayner
- "Impossible Is Nothing" (Iggy Azalea song)
- "Impossible Is Nothing" (Tonic Breed song)

== See also ==
- Nothing Is Impossible (disambiguation)
