= Rain, Part 3 =

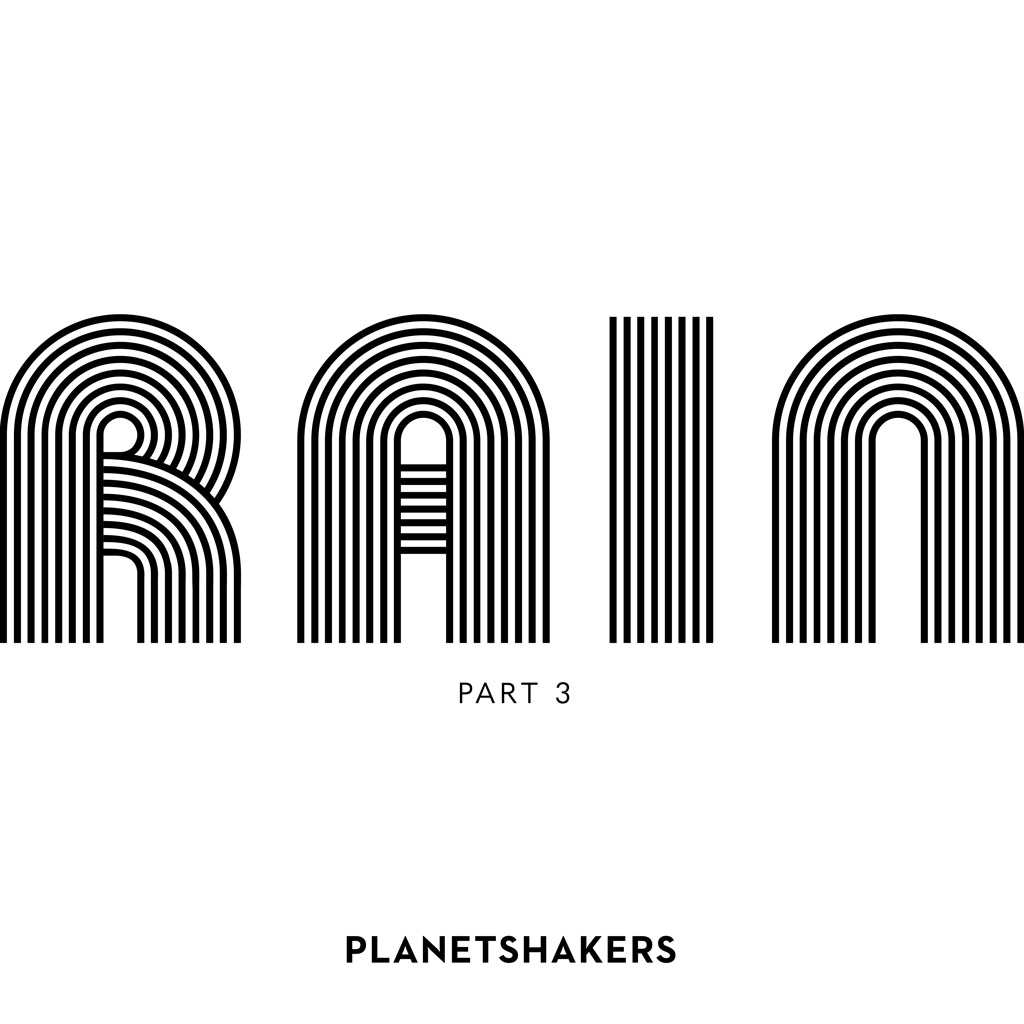

EP by Planetshakers
- Released: 9 August 2019
- Recorded: 2019
- Genre: Worship
- Length: 24:44
- Label: Planetshakers Ministries International, Venture3Media
- Producer: Joth Hunt

Planetshakers chronology
Rain, Part 2 (2019)	Rain, Part 3 (2019)	Rain (2019)

Rain, Part 3 is a live EP from Planetshakers. This album was released on 9 August 2019 by Planetshakers Ministries International and Venture3Media.

== Critical reception ==
Professional ratings
Review scores
Source	Rating
Cross Rhythms	6/10 squares
Louder Than the Music	4.5/5 stars

Lins Honeyman gave the EP a score of six out of ten for Cross Rhythms. Joni Davies gave the EP a four and half star review in Louder Than the Music.

== Track listing ==
No.	Title	Length
1.	"My Reason" (live)	4:33
2.	"Fall on Me" (live)	3:46
3.	"God Is on the Throne" (live)	7:52
4.	"Rain Your Glory Down" (live)	9:07
Total length:		24:44
