= Only Way =

Single by Planetshakers

from the album Rain
- Released: March 8, 2019
- Studio: Planetshakers Studios in Melbourne, Australia
- Genre: Contemporary worship music
- Length: 4:33
- Label: Planetshakers Ministries International, Venture3Media
- Songwriter(s): Joth Hunt; Samantha Evans
- Producer(s): Joth Hunt

Planetshakers singles chronology
"Heaven on Earth" (2018)	"Only Way" (2019)

Music video
- "Only Way" on YouTube

"Only Way" is a song by Australian contemporary worship band Planetshakers. It was released on March 8, 2019, as the lead single from their live album, Rain (2019). The song was written by Joth Hunt and Samantha Evans. It appeared on the EP Rain, Part 2.

== Background ==
In January 2019, Joth Hunt was diagnosed with cancer, and due to his illness he wrote the songs "Only Way" and "God Is On The Throne" victory and faith declaration songs about Hunt's situation. After 10 days the doctor performed an operation in which after further analysis the cancer appeared to have been cured.

== Critical reception ==
Professional ratings
Review scores
Source	Rating
365 Days of Inspiring Media	4/5 stars

Joshua Andre of 365 Days of Inspiring Media said "Probably the most personal and emotional song that Planetshakers have ever recorded, "Only Way" is an explosive guitar led pop/rock anthem, which released this month and is inspired by the tumultuous ordeal of lead singer Joth Hunt's surgery to remove a cancerous tumor early last year. With Joth in the midst of a desperate situation, "Only Way" was born, and like Joth has been give comfort by his own song; so too does he want others in Australia and in the entire world to be impacted by God moving in his own life."

== Music videos ==
The official music video for the song was released on March 6, 2019 and has garnered over 2,7 million views as of January 2021.

== Charts ==
Chart (2019)	Peak position
US Christian Airplay (Billboard)	48

== Release history ==
Region	Date	Format	Label	Ref.
Worldwide	March 8, 2019	Digital download	Planetshakers Ministries International; Venture3Media	
United States	May 20, 2019	Christian radio	Planetshakers Ministries International; Venture3Media	
