= Over It All =

Studio album by Planetshakers
- Released: November 6, 2020
- Recorded: 2020
- Studio: Planetshakers Studios in Melbourne, Australia
- Genre: Worship
- Length: 49:00
- Label: Planetshakers Ministries International, Venture3Media
- Producer: Joth Hunt

Planetshakers chronology
It's Christmas (2019)	Over It All (2020)	It's Christmas Live (2020)

Singles from Planetshakers
- 1. "All I Can Say – Thank You" Released: June 12, 2020

Over It All is a studio album from Australian worship band Planetshakers. Planetshakers Ministries International and Venture3Media released the album on 6 November 2020. The album was recorded at Planetshakers Studios at Melbourne, Australia, under one of the most extreme and crippling quarantine measures in the world due to COVID-19. They worked with Joth Hunt, in the production of this album.

== Critical reception ==
Professional ratings
Review scores
Source	Rating
One Man In The Middle	8.7/10 stars

Randy Cross from Worship Leader wrote "More: Incredibly balanced. Perfectly Planetshakers. Over It All releases a cavalcade of praise and worship with a little something stylistically for everyone. Less: Very reminiscent of some of the "dance club" contemporary Christian music of the 90s, which is not necessarily a bad thing, just something that not every listener may enjoy". Rating the album 8.7 stars by One Man In The Middle, Rob Allwright states, "This album musically, taking advantage of the studio setting. I think they have also had to consider a lot more the lyrics. In a worship setting it is possible to lead and bring songs that sound great, tick all the right boxes for people to engage with them but ultimately say very little either to or about God, or to the worshipper themselves.

== Track listing ==
Over it All
No.	Title	Writer(s)	Worship leader(s)	Length
1.	"247 365"	Joth Hunt, Sam Evans & Andy Harrison	Joth Hunt	3:34
2.	"All Things New"	Joth Hunt, Andy Harrison	Rudy Nikkerud	3:57
3.	"So Fresh"	Joth Hunt, Andy Harrison	Joth Hunt	3:41
4.	"Over It All"	Joth Hunt, Sam Evans	Joth Hunt	4:36
5.	"All I Can Say (Thank You)"	Joth Hunt	Natalie Ruiz, Chelsi Nikkerud, Joth Hunt	5:31
6.	"Caught Up in Your Presence"	Noah Walker, Joth Hunt, Sam Evans & BJ Pridham	Samantha Evans	5:23
7.	"Chains Are Breaking"	Joth Hunt & Sam Evans	Sam Evans, Noah Walker	3:29
8.	"Champion"	Joth Hunt & Sam Evans	Joth Hunt	4:10
9.	"Call On Your Name"	Joth Hunt	Joth Hunt	6:04
10.	"Great Outpouring"	Andy Harrison	Chelsi Nikkerud, Natalie Ruiz, Joth Hunt, Sam Evans, Andy Harrison	8:14
Total length:				49:00

== Chart performance ==
Chart (2020)	Peak position
Independent Albums (AIR)	8

== Personnel ==
Adapted from AllMusic.

- Planetshakers – Primary artist
- Joth Hunt – Artwork, Composer, Design, Guitar, Keyboards, Mixing, Producer, Programming, Project Coordinator, Video Director, Vocals
- Samantha Evans – Composer, Editing, Executive Producer, Vocals
- Rudy Nikkerud – Vocals
- Chelsi Nikkerud – Vocals
- Andy Harrison – Composer, Drums, Vocals
- Natalie Ruiz – Vocals
- Brian "Bj" Pridham – Composer
- Noah Walker – Composer
- Jennifer Bourke – Project Coordinator
- Joshua Brown – A&R
- Joe Carra – Mastering
- Christel Chia – Editing
- Daryl – Artwork, Design, Editing
- Vian Cronje – Artwork, Design
- Micaela Elliott – Editing
- Russell Evans – Executive Producer
