= Heaven on Earth, Part 2 =

2018 EP by Planetshakers

EP by Planetshakers
- Released: 13 July 2018
- Recorded: April 4–7, 2018
- Genre: Worship, contemporary Christian
- Length: 25:23
- Label: Planetshakers Ministries International, Venture3Media
- Producer: Joth Hunt

Planetshakers chronology
Heaven on Earth, Part 1 (2018)	Heaven on Earth, Part 2 (2018)	Heaven on Earth, Part 3 (2018)

Heaven on Earth, Part 2 is a live EP from Planetshakers, recorded live during Planetshakers Kingdom Conference, held in Melbourne, Australia 4–7 April 2018 at Hisense Arena. This album was released on 13 July 2018 by Planetshakers Ministries International and Venture3Media.

== Critical reception ==
Professional ratings
Review scores
Source	Rating
CCM Magazine	3/5 stars
Cross Rhythms	8/10 squares
Louder Than the Music	4.5/5 stars

Awarding the album three stars at CCM Magazine, Matt Conner stated: "Still all these songs are certainly enjoyable with a depth on the second half that's worth checking out". Giving the EP a four-star review for Louder Than the Music, Jono Davies concluded, "this is an EP awash in 80s inspiration. The energy level is up there and is captured perfectly on the EP. You feel you are at a live event yet the musical creativity of the songs isn't lost at all in it being recorded live. Lins Honeyman, indicating in an eight out of ten reviews from Cross Rhythms wrote that the EP's "gorgeous funk bass lines and general sassiness, sound tantalisingly close to what it would be like if the Scissor Sisters were to do worship songs".

== Track listing ==
No.	Title	Writer(s)	Length
1.	"Move Out of My Way" (live)	Andy Harrison / Joth Hunt	3:55
2.	"Electric Atmosphere" (live)	BJ Pridham / Joth Hunt	3:27
3.	"I Want Jesus" (live)	BJ Pridham / Joth Hunt	7:41
4.	"Draw Close Again" (live)	BJ Pridham	10:20
Total length:			25:23

== Chart performance ==
Chart (2018)	Peak position
US Christian Album Sales (Billboard)	45
