= Legacy, Part 1: Alive Again =

EP by Planetshakers
- Released: 17 March 2017
- Recorded: 2017
- Genre: Worship
- Length: 21:34
- Labels: Planetshakers Ministries International, Integrity Music
- Producer: Joth Hunt

Planetshakers chronology
Sé Quién Eres Tú (2016)	Legacy, Part 1: Alive Again (2017)	Legacy, Part 2: Passion (2017)

Legacy, Part 1: Alive Again is a live EP from Planetshakers, recorded live in Manila (Quezon City, Philippines, and Kuala Lumpur, Malaysia, during the 20th anniversary. Planetshakers Ministries International and Integrity Music released the album on 17 March 2017.

== Critical reception ==
Professional ratings
Review scores
Source	Rating
365 Days of Inspiring Media	4/5 stars
Jesus Freak Hideout	4.5/5 stars

In a four-star review for 365 Days of Inspiring Media, Jonathan Andre concluded that it is "Overall an EP that has continued my reinvigorated interest for Planetshakers a bit more, even though this EP itself didn't really find its feet; Legacy Pt 1: Alive Again has created momentum as I anticipate further 'part's to release later on during 2017." Rating the album four and half stars for Jesus Freak Hideout, Bert Gangl wrote, "The leadoff cut on the EP, 'Alive Again,' bursts forth in a bright and brilliant surge of melodic, hook-filled goodness sure to elevate the spirits and quicken the pulses of all but the most finicky of power pop aficionados. Interestingly enough, the stellar opening track works as something of a double-edged sword. On the one hand, its irresistible energy and impeccable pop sheen draw listeners into the proceedings almost immediately, which, one could argue, is the hallmark of any good pop composition. On the other hand, though, it sets an incredibly high water mark that renders it exceedingly hard to replicate, which, as it turns out, winds up being the case."

== Track listing ==
No.	Title	Length
1.	"Alive Again" (live in Manila)	4:12
2.	"Drawing Closer" (live in Kuala Lumpur)	4:35
3.	"You Are Here" (live in Manila)	6:20
4.	"All on the Altar" (live in Kuala Lumpur)	6:27
Total length:		21:34
