= Heaven on Earth (Planetshakers song) =

"Heaven on Earth (Radio Single)"

Single by Planetshakers

from the album Heaven on Earth
- Released: October 12, 2018
- Studio: Planetshakers Studios in Melbourne, Australia
- Genre: Contemporary worship music
- Length: 3:45
- Label: Planetshakers Ministries International, Venture3Media
- Songwriter(s): Joth Hunt; Samantha Evans; Andy Harrison
- Producer(s): Bryan Fowler (TobyMac, Chris Tomlin) y Micah Kuiper

Planetshakers singles chronology
"I Know Who You Are" (2016)	"Heaven on Earth (Radio Single)" (2018)	"Only Way" (2019)

Music video
- "HEAVEN ON EARTH" on YouTube

"Heaven on Earth" is a song by Australian contemporary worship band Planetshakers. It was released on October 12, 2018, as the lead single from their live album, Heaven on Earth (2018). The song was written by Joth Hunt, Samantha Evans and Andy Harrison. It appeared on the EP Heaven on Earth, Part 3.

== Background ==
"Heaven on Earth", produced by Bryan Fowler (TobyMac, Chris Tomlin) and Micah Kuiper, was released on October 12, 2018, to streaming and digital retail platforms and added on AC and radio CHR. After adding the song to the radio it became Billboard's No. 1 most-added song on the USA Hot AC / CHR radio charts for two consecutive weeks.

== Music videos ==
The official music video for the song was released on October 18, 2018, and has garnered over 658 thousand views as of January 2021.

== Charts ==
Chart (2019)	Peak position
US Christian Airplay (Billboard)	41

=== Year-end charts ===
Chart (2019)	Position
US Hot Christian Songs (Billboard)	45

== Release history ==
Region	Date	Format	Label	Ref.
United States	October 23, 2018	Christian radio	Planetshakers Ministries International; Venture3Media	
