= Nothing Is Impossible (Planetshakers Kids album) =

2013 studio album by Planetshakers Kids

Studio album by Planetshakers Church
- Released: November 19, 2013
- Recorded: 2013
- Studio: Experientia Studio in Franklin, Tennessee; Planetshakers Studios in Melbourne, Australia
- Genre: Worship, Children's music
- Length: 45:00
- Label: Planetshakers Ministries International, Crossroad, Integrity
- Producer: Joth Hunt, Josh Ham

Planetshakers Kids chronology
Nothing Is Impossible (2013)

Nothing Is Impossible is the first album of praise and worship for children from the Planetshakers Church. Planetshakers through their social networks announced the release of their first children's album on November 19, 2013. Nothing Is Impossible was released by Planetshakers Ministries International, Crossroad and Integrity Music. They worked with Joth Hunt in the production of this album.

== Artwork ==
Paul Orton, Cover Designer, Creative Artist and Children's Pastor of Planetshakers Church in Melbourne, shared the Planetshakers Kids album artwork on his social media. The final cover of the album is a photo of a boy standing on top of the ice looking up at the clear sky next to a purple flag. Orton also shared the artwork from the album Nothing Is Impossible on his blog.

== Critical reception ==
Professional ratings
Review scores
Source	Rating
Kristiya Know	4.6/5 stars
Amazon.com	positive

Marc Daniel Rivera, awarding the album gave it a 4.6 stars rating from Kristiya Know, says, "Overall, this record, with its songs, scripture readings plus prayers, gives the children a unique opportunity to worship God while impressing in their hearts the hunger for worship and for more of Jesus in spite of their age."

A staff editor at Amazon.com gave the album a relatively positive review, writing, "The music from Planetshakers Kids provides Christ-centered, positive and uplifting music for the whole family. It is music any Christian kid would want to give their friends, because it is just as cool as what they might hear on the radio or TV."

== Awards and accolades ==
In the 2014, the album Nothing Is Impossible was nominated for a Dove Award in the category: "Children's Music Album of the Year" at the 45th Annual GMA Dove Awards.

== Track listing ==
No.	Title	Writer(s)	Length
1.	"Intro"		0:30
2.	"Nothing Is Impossible"	Joth Hunt	3:47
3.	"Psalm 100:4 & 5 (NIV) & Prayer"		0:19
4.	"This Is The Day"	Andy Harrison / Joth Hunt / B.J. Pridham	2:57
5.	"You Are Good"	Joth Hunt	2:50
6.	"Put Your Hands Up"	Joth Hunt	2:49
7.	"Acts 2:24 (NIV) & Prayer"		0:19
8.	"The Anthem"	Joth Hunt / Henry Seeley / Liz Webber	3:44
9.	"Healer"	Michael Guglielmucci	4:46
10.	"Let Praise Awaken"	Andy Harrison / Joth Hunt	3:27
11.	"Get Up"	Andy Harrison / Joth Hunt	3:02
12.	"Limitless"	Joth Hunt	3:15
13.	"I Call You Jesus"	Israel Houghton / Joth Hunt	4:03
14.	"We Cry Out"	Sam Evans / Joth Hunt	4:38
15.	"Lamentations 3:22 & 23 (NLT) & Prayer"		0:20
16.	"Great Is Your Love"	Joth Hunt / B.J. Pridham	4:44
Total length:			45:00

== Personnel ==
Vocals

- Jonathan Hunt
- Chelsi Nikkerud
- Aimee Evans

Kids Choir Vocalists

- Beverly Carter
- Taylor Carter
- Savannah Schrieber
- Emily Eisa
- Marissa Eisa
- Matthew Daniel
- Kenneth Eakins
- David Anleu
- Chris Beadle
- Gerald Hornbuckle
- Celia Kate Mellett
- Preston Beard
- María Flores
- Katie Allin
- Hannah Johnson
- Jonathan Brown
- Neema Andrews
- Joel Mangosteen
- Kayla Culbreath
- Jude Beard
- Gabriella Quintanilla
- Makayla Tubbs
- Celeste Chapa
- Julián Chapa
- Haler Bringham
- Jonathan Martínez
- Mahely Martínez
- Lia Doherty
- Seattle Nilsson
- Victoria Marin
- Aiden Mellett
- Gracie Mellett
- Abel George
- Aída George
- Abigail Savage
- Caleb Savage
- Sela Thiessen
- Colin Mellet
- Addison Hurst
- Aubrey Hurst
- Christian Thiessen
- Gracen Beard
- Emily Martiniez
- Seanie B Mellett

Prayers

- Jenibelle Font
- Nemue Hernández
- Sole Lugo Carrillo
- Grace Estefanía Gutarra
- Avril Marie Mejía
- Estefanía Fernández Acosta
- Gabriel Emilo Figueroa
- Lyangie Fontanet Zayas
- Raquel Méndez
- Jesús David Gil
- Paola Burgos
- Sole Lugo

Prayers & Bible Readings

- Thaddeus Owl
- Emilie Hughes
- Evans Hughes
- Amy Ferguson
- Jodeci Tofete
- Rachel Kunnumpurath
- Eliah Chekole

A&R

- Joshua Brown
- Steve Merkel

Artist development

- Craig Dunnagan

Mixing

- Ainslie Grosser at Experientia Studio, Franklin, Tennessee
- Joth Hunt, mixed the song (We Cry Out) at Planetshakers Studios, Melbourne, Australia

Mastering

- Dan Snike at Tone and Volume Mastering

Programming

- Josh Ham
- Joth Hunt

Guitars and Keyboards

- Joth Hunt
- Josh Ham

Artwork (cover design)

- Paul Orton

Production Coordinator

- Beca Nicholson

Kids Choir Vocal Producer

- Michael Mellet
- Aimee Beard

Kids Choir Recording Engineers

- BK "chizzle" Beard
- Casey "sunshine" Graham

Vocal producer

- Steve Merkel

Producers

- Joth Hunt
- Josh Ham

Executive producers

- Russell & Sam Evans
- C. Ryan Dunham
