= Christmas Vol. 2 =

EP by Planetshakers
- Released: 23 November 2018
- Recorded: 2018
- Studio: Planetshakers Studios in Melbourne, Australia
- Genre: Contemporary Christian music, Christmas music
- Length: 16:11
- Label: Planetshakers Ministries International, Venture3Media
- Producer: Joth Hunt

Planetshakers chronology
Christmas Vol. 1 (2017)	Christmas Vol. 2 (2018)	It's Christmas (2019)

Planetshakers Christmas albums chronology
Christmas Vol. 1 (2017)	Christmas Vol. 2 (2018)	It's Christmas (2019)

Christmas Vol. 2 is the second Christmas worship EP of Contemporary worship music band Planetshakers. Planetshakers Ministries International and Venture3Media released the EP on 23 November 2018.

== Critical reception ==
Professional ratings
Review scores
Source	Rating
CCM Magazine	4/5 stars
Cross Rhythms	9/10 squares
One Man In the Middle	7.5/10 stars
New Release Today	4/5 stars
365 Days of Inspiring Media	4.5/5 stars

Awarding the album four stars at CCM Magazine, Andrew Greenhalgh states, "Filled with plenty of Planetshakers cheer, Christmas Vol. 2 will be a welcome musical treat for longtime fans."

Tony Cummings, indicating in a nine out of ten review from Cross Rhythms, says, Christmas Vol. 2 is an album "with such a beautiful melody is given an appropriately slow and reverential arrangement."

Rob Allwright, gave a seven and a half review of ten stars by One Man In the Middle states, "Like the previous release this is a four track EP which features the Planetshakers style of worship blended with some Christmas classics and this release also has an original track on it."

Rating the album four stars by New Release Today, Jake Frederick describes, Final Word: "Christmas, Vol. 2 is a great album to help celebrate the season. The fresh take on the classic carols will keep this EP a part of Christmas collections in the years to come."

Joshua Andre, specifying in a four and a half star review for 365 Days of Inspiring Media, replies, Overall an enjoyable EP that continues my reinvigorated interest for Planetshakers a bit more; this track list has certainly taken me by surprise, well musically at least, of what the band is capable of. Even though the album still is more electronic than it needs to be; Planetshakers have nonetheless done Australia proud with their latest Christmas anthems and dance melodies, full of inspiring messages and uplifting lyrics about Jesus!

== Track listing ==
No.	Title	Length
1.	"O Come All Ye Faithful"	3:43
2.	"The First Noel"	3:15
3.	"O Holy Night"	5:56
4.	"Light Of The World"	3:17
Total length:		16:11
