= The Anthem (Planetshakers song) =

Single by Planetshakers

from the album Limitless
- Released: December 15, 2012
- Recorded: 2012
- Genre: Worship
- Length: 7:32
- Label: Planetshakers Ministries International, Integrity
- Songwriter(s): Joth Hunt; Henry Seeley; Liz Webber
- Producer(s): Joth Hunt

Planetshakers singles chronology
"Nothing Is Impossible" (2011)	"The Anthem" (2012)	"Endless Praise" (2014)

Music video
- "The Anthem (Full Song)" on YouTube

"The Anthem" is a worship song by Australian contemporary worship band Planetshakers. It was released on December 15, 2012, as the single from their 2013 live album Limitless. The song also appeared on Planetshakers Kids' 2013 album Nothing Is Impossible, on the 2014 album Nada Es Imposible and it also appears in the album All For Love (2008). The song was written by Joth Hunt, Henry Seeley and Liz Webber. The song has been covered by a number of Christian music artists including Todd Dulaney, Travis Greene and Elevation Worship led by the worship singer Chris Brown. This song has been translated and interpreted in many evangelical churches around the world.

== Commercial performance ==
In May 2014, Planetshakers received an invitation from James Robinson of the American television program Life Today with James Robison to sing the song The Anthem live. In October 2016, on invitation from Brian Johnson, the band visited Bethel Church in Redding, California, where the band performed the song live. In November 10, 2015, the band visited the church El Lugar de Su Presencia in Colombia to sing the song "El Himno" in Spanish.

== Music videos ==
The official music video for the song was released on December 15, 2012, and has garnered over 11 million views as of April 2021.

== Accolades ==
"The Anthem" was ranked eighteenth on the Worship Leader's Top 20 Songs of 2013 list.

In 2016, the song was nominated for the Dove Award Urban Worship Recorded Song Of The Year at the 47th Annual GMA Dove Awards.

== Covers and renditions ==
The song has been covered by various Christian music artists from around the world, including Todd Dulaney, Travis Greene and Elevation Worship among other artists. It has been sung in churches around the world, and has been translated into many languages.

On March 26, 2013, Travis Greene released a cover of the song from his album Faceless Noise and also from his album Intentional released on August 21, 2015. On November 10, 2014, VaShawn Mitchell released the song "The Anthem" titled (Medley) from the album Unstoppable. On April 15, 2016, Todd Dulaney released a rendition of "The Anthem" from the album A Worshipper's Heart and also from the album To Africa With Love released on March 15, 2019. The song debuted at No. 1 on the Billboard Hot Gospel Airplay chart on April 30, 2016, on the Gospel Digital Song Sales Chart at No. 3 and on the Hot Gospel Songs chart at No. 4.

== Chart performance ==
The song also topped the Billboard Hot Gospel Airplay chart, the Billboard Gospel Digital Song Sales chart and the Billboard Hot Gospel Songs chart.

Chart (2016)	Peak position
US Gospel Airplay (Billboard)	1
US Gospel Digital Songs Sales (Billboard)	3
US Hot Gospel Songs (Billboard)	4
