= Heaven on Earth, Part 1 =

EP by Planetshakers
- Released: 6 April 2018
- Recorded: January 11–13, 2018
- Genre: Worship, contemporary Christian
- Length: 23:53
- Label: Planetshakers Ministries International, Venture3Media
- Producer: Joth Hunt

Planetshakers chronology
Heaven on Earth, Part 1 (2018)	Heaven on Earth, Part 2 (2018)

Heaven on Earth, Part 1 is a live EP from Planetshakers, recorded during Planetshakers Kingdom Conference, in Malaysia, Singapore and the Philippines. This album was released on 6 April 2018 by Planetshakers Ministries International and Venture3Media.

== Critical reception ==
Professional ratings
Review scores
Source	Rating
CCM Magazine	4/5 stars
Hallels	3.5/5 stars

Awarding the album four stars at CCM Magazine, Matt Conner states, "As the title’s suffix implies, the latest Planetshakers album is just one of multiple Heaven On Earth EPs slated for release. Part One is comprised of four songs recorded from the band’s regional worship conferences recently held in Malaysia, Singapore and the Philippines. "There Is No One Like You" kicks off a literal praise party with such spunk and style that it’s easy for the listener to imagine a dizzying array of lights and accompanying visuals. "The Greatest" maintains the energetic pace albeit with more of a rock and roll vibe before slowing things slightly for "Above All Names." The EP's closing track, "Not Alone," is its shining moment, a memorable chorus that reminds the congregation of God's people of His eternal presence. It's the latter that should continue to be sung well after future installments of Heaven On Earth are released." Giving the album a three and a half star rating in a Hallels review, Timothy Yap said: "Described as a "praise party," the EP's opener "There's No One Like You" gives illustration to such a designation with its steely beats and larger-than-life synth loops. "The Greatest" prolongs the party; this time with the team enjoying lots of microphone passing moments with the congregation as they sing in roaring enthusiasm. Just as with a finely crafted worship set, track three slows down the pace on what is one of Planetshaker's best worship power ballads "Above All Names." "Not Alone," may not be as congregational focused as the preceding track, but it's a reflective ballad that thrives on its soul-stirring piano backing."

== Track listing ==
No.	Title	Length
1.	"There Is No One Like You" (live in Asia)	4:18
2.	"The Greatest" (live in Asia)	5:04
3.	"Above All Names" (live in Asia)	8:33
4.	"Not Alone" (live in Asia)	5:58
Total length:		23:53
