= Rain, Part 2 =

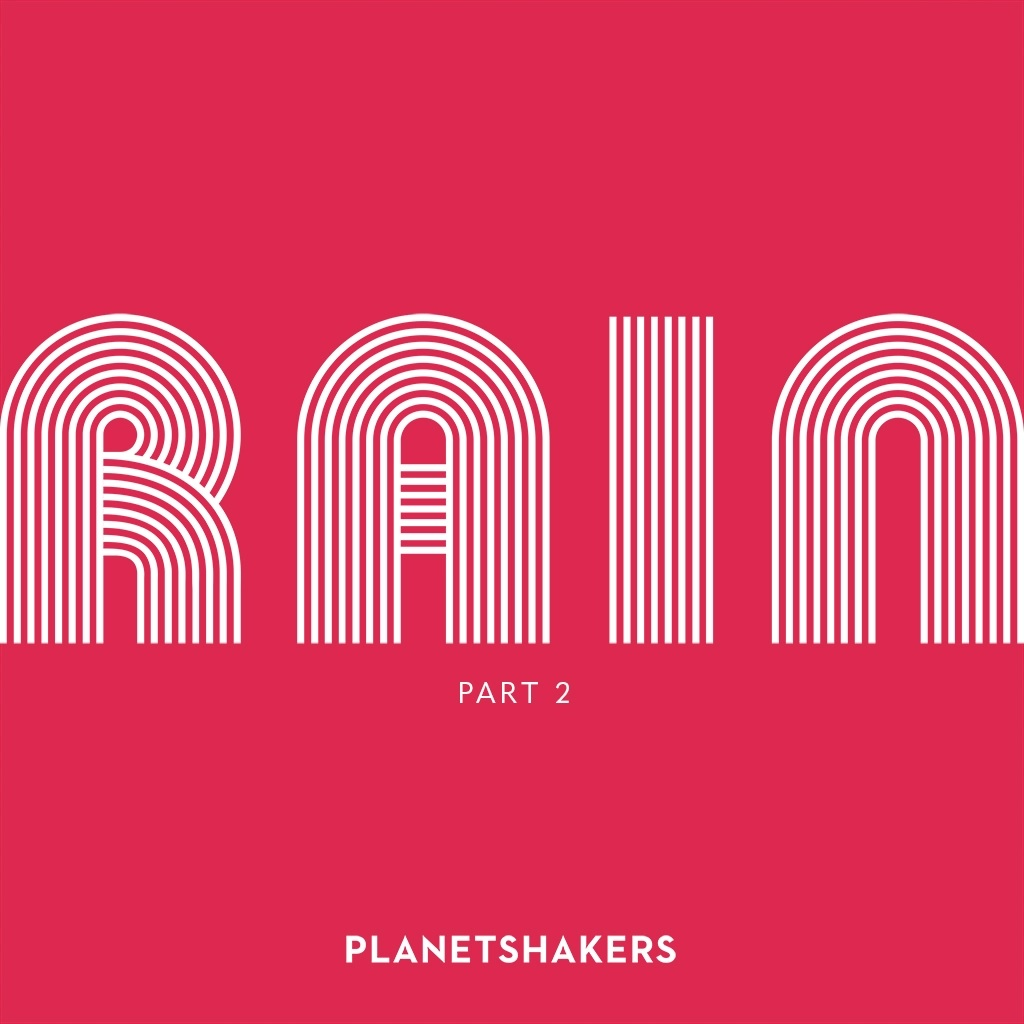

EP by Planetshakers
- Released: 12 April 2019
- Recorded: 2019
- Genre: Worship
- Length: 29:15
- Label: Planetshakers Ministries International, Venture3Media
- Producer: Joth Hunt

Planetshakers chronology
Rain, Part 1 (2019)	Rain, Part 2 (2019)	Rain, Part 3 (2019)

Rain, Part 2 is a live EP from Planetshakers, recorded in Planetshakers Conferences in the Philippines and Malaysia. It was released on 12 April 2019 by Planetshakers Ministries International and Venture3Media.

== Critical reception ==
Professional ratings
Review scores
Source	Rating
365 Days of Inspiring Media	2/5 stars
Jesus Freak Hideout	3/5 stars

Joshua Andre, of 365 Days of Inspiring Media, considered that only one song ("Only Way") on the album had "emotional impact", but conceded that it is "the most personal and emotional song that Planetshakers have ever recorded", and noted that it was inspired by lead singer Joth Hunt's surgery to remove a cancerous tumor. Rating the album three stars for Jesus Freak Hideout, Bert Gangl considered it to be "pleasant enough", but felt that the band had reached "the point of diminishing returns".

== Track listing ==
No.	Title	Length
1.	"Only Way" (live)	4:33
2.	"I Choose You" (live)	3:46
3.	"Take Your Place" (live)	9:04
4.	"Anything Can Happen" (live)	8:14
5.	"God Is on the Throne" (studio)	3:37
Total length:		29:15
