= Christmas Vol. 1 =

EP by Planetshakers
- Released: 1 December 2017
- Recorded: 2017
- Studio: Planetshakers Studios in Melbourne, Australia
- Genre: Contemporary Christian music, Christmas music
- Length: 13:22
- Label: Planetshakers Ministries International, Integrity Music
- Producer: Joth Hunt

Planetshakers chronology
Christmas Vol. 1 (2017)	Christmas Vol. 2 (2018)

Planetshakers Christmas albums chronology
Christmas Vol. 1 (2017)	Christmas Vol. 2 (2018)

Christmas Vol. 1 is the first Christmas worship EP of Contemporary worship music band Planetshakers. Planetshakers Ministries International and Integrity Music released the album on 1 December 2017.

== Critical reception ==
Professional ratings
Review scores
Source	Rating
Hallels	3.5/5 stars
365 Days of Inspiring Media	4/5 stars
New Release Today	4/5 stars

Awarding the album three and a half stars from Hallels reviewer Timothy Yap stated "Christmas Vol. 1," this is a four-song set, with the Melbourne, Australia worship team tackling three traditional carols and one original. The pride of this set is that Planetshakers have taken the time to give each of these ancient paeans a contemporary dressing, making them palatable to today's synth-driven pop soundscape. Jonathan Andre, specifying in a four star review for 365 Days of Inspiring Media, replies, Overall an enjoyable EP that definitely continues my reinvigorated interest for Planetshakers a bit more; this track list has certainly taken me by surprise, well musically at least, of what the band is capable of. Even though one track was severely lacking, the other three more than made up for the mishap, and Planetshakers have done Australia proud with their latest Christmas anthems and dance melodies, full of inspiring messages and uplifting lyrics about Jesus! Phill Feltham, indicating in a four star review by New Release Today, describes, "The Bottom Line: The Planetshakers' first Christmas EP is a holiday sampler of sounds. "Joy to the World" and "Silent Night" in particular engage the listeners with their vocals and music, evoking emotion and holiday cheer."

== Track listing ==
No.	Title	Length
1.	"Hark"	3:12
2.	"Joy To The World"	2:44
3.	"Silent Night"	3:47
4.	"It’s Christmas"	3:39
Total length:		13:22
