= Rain, Part 1 =

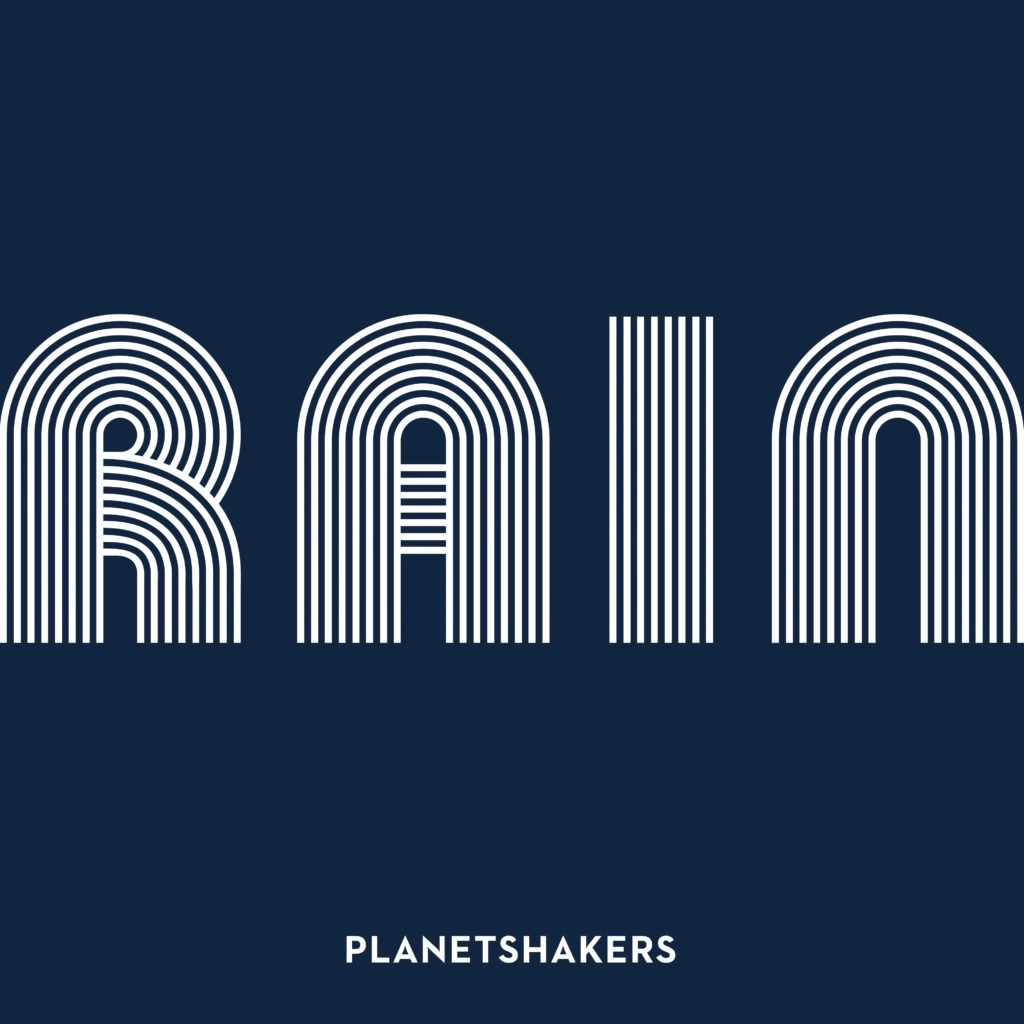

EP by Planetshakers
- Released: 18 January 2019
- Recorded: 2019
- Genre: Worship
- Length: 27:17
- Label: Planetshakers Ministries International, Venture3Media
- Producer: Joth Hunt

Planetshakers chronology
Rain, Part 1 (2019)	Rain, Part 2 (2019)

Rain, Part 1 is a live EP from Planetshakers. This album was released on 18 January 2019 by Planetshakers Ministries International and Integrity Music. The EP from Planetshakers was recorded in Melbourne, Australia, at Planetshakers Church.

== Critical reception ==
Professional ratings
Review scores
Source	Rating
365 Days of Inspiring Media	3.5/5 stars
Jesus Freak Hideout	3/5 stars

Joshua Andre, specifying in a three and half star review for 365 Days of Inspiring Media, Overall a solid and competent EP that still needs improvement and work, but also continues my interest for Planetshakers a bit more; this first EP in a new series doesn't compare to the tracks on Heaven And Earth yet. However these tracks are on the whole inspiring and hopeful and can be cried out and sung to Jesus during times of joy and hardship. Rating the album three stars for Jesus Freak Hideout, Bert Gangl says, In its defense, the Planetshakers collective is undoubtedly talented, as anyone who has sifted through their last few EPs to pick out the strongest compositions can testify. And fans who love radio-based pop/worship are likely to find Rain (Part 1) right up their alley. That said, a few more months between successive offerings would almost surely provide the Melbourne-based outfit the time needed to replenish their creative juices and turn out a truly noteworthy next release.

== Track listing ==
No.	Title	Length
1.	"All Around" (live)	4:33
2.	"I Lift Your Name Up" (live)	3:46
3.	"Right Now" (live)	9:04
4.	"Fire Fall" (live)	8:14
Total length:		27:17
