= Heaven on Earth (Planetshakers album) =

Live album by Planetshakers
- Released: 19 October 2018
- Recorded: January – April 2018
- Venue: Gedung Sabuga Convention Hall, Bandung, Indonesia Hisense Arena, Melbourne, Australia Smart Araneta Coliseum, Manila, Philippines Sunway Pyramid Convention Centre, Kuala Lumpur, Malaysia
- Genre: Worship
- Length: 83:44
- Label: Planetshakers Ministries International, Venture3Media
- Producer: Joth Hunt

Planetshakers chronology
Legado (2017)	Heaven on Earth (2018)	Rain (2019)

Singles from Planetshakers
- 1. "Heaven on Earth" Released: October 12, 2018

Heaven on Earth is a live album from Planetshakers. Planetshakers Ministries International and Venture3Media released the album on 19 October 2018. They worked with Joth Hunt in the production of this album. This disc was recorded in Melbourne Indonesia, Philippines, Malaysia.

== Critical reception ==
Professional ratings
Review scores
Source	Rating
365 Days of Inspiring Media	4.5/5 stars
Jesus Freak Hideout	4.5/5 stars

Joshua Andre, specifying in a four and a half star review for 365 Days of Inspiring Media, replies, "Overall an enjoyable album that has definitely continues my reinvigorated interest for Planetshakers a bit more; this unique and diverse track list has certainly created momentum, and given me new songs to sing out to Jesus during times of joy and hardship." Rating the album four and a half stars for Jesus Freak Hideout, Bert Gangl says, "The combined project also features a 10-track DVD, a slightly shorter radio edit of the title cut, and a "heavy" version of "Move Out of My Way," the former of which is largely the same as its original counterpart and the latter of which winds up as more of a parody than a tribute to the '80s pop metal idiom." Jasmin Patterson, by New Release Today, describes finally, "There are songs and moments on Heaven On The Earth for every expression of worship, from joyful praise to reverent awe and personal encounter. Whatever moment or season you find yourself in, this album will help you connect with God."

== Track listing ==
Heaven on Earth
No.	Title	Writer(s)	Length
1.	"There Is No One Like You (Live in Asia)"	Samantha Evans / Andy Harrison / Joth Hunt	4:18
2.	"Electric Atmosphere (Live)"	Joth Hunt	3:27
3.	"Heaven on Earth"	Sam Evans / Andy Harrison / Joth Hunt	4:15
4.	"Through it all (Remix)"	Joth Hunt	4:34
5.	"Above All Names (Live in Asia)"	Joth Hunt / B.J. Pridham	8:33
6.	"Draw Close Again (Live)"	Joth Hunt / B.J. Pridham	10:20
7.	"Not Alone (Live in Asia)"	Andy Harrison	5:58
8.	"Move Out of My Way (Live)"	Andy Harrison / Joth Hunt	3:55
9.	"The Greatest (Live in Asia)"	Joth Hunt	5:04
10.	"Rivers (Live)"	Joth Hunt / B.J. Pridham	7:43
11.	"I Want Jesus (Live)"	Joth Hunt / B.J. Pridham	7:41
12.	"Overcome It All"	Sam Evans / Joth Hunt	5:43
13.	"Nothing Is Impossible (EDM Remix)"	Joth Hunt	4:18
14.	"Move Out of My Way (Heavy Remix)"	Joth Hunt	3:42
15.	"Heaven on Earth (Radio Single)"	Joth Hunt	3:46
Total length:			83:44

== Charts ==
=== Singles ===
Year	Single	Peak chart positions
Year	Single	US Christian Airplay
2019	"Heaven on Earth"	41

=== Year-end charts ===
Chart (2019)	Position
US Billboard Hot Christian Songs	45
