= Nothing Is Impossible (Planetshakers album) =

Studio album by Planetshakers
- Released: 12 April 2011
- Recorded: 6–9 April 2010
- Studios: Planetshakers Studios in Melbourne, Australia
- Genre: Worship
- Length: 66:44
- Labels: Planetshakers Ministries International, Integrity, Columbia
- Producer: Joth Hunt

Planetshakers chronology
Even Greater (2010)	Nothing Is Impossible (2011)	Heal Our Land (2012)

Nothing Is Impossible is a studio album by the Australian worship band Planetshakers. Planetshakers Ministries International, Integrity Music and Columbia released the album on April 12, 2011.

== Critical reception ==
Professional ratings
Review scores
Source	Rating
Cross Rhythms	9/10 squares
Ganns Deen	4.25/5 stars

Mike Gill, in a nine out of ten review from Cross Rhythms, says, "The album, produced by Joth Hunt, exudes the excitement and cutting edge professionalism that we have come to expect. This is a sonic feast for those with a taste for solid rock worship. The opening track "Power" is a no-nonsense energy song that demonstrates the world class quality of the rhythm section of Mark Peric (bass) and Mike Webber (drums); guest worshipper Israel Houghton pulls out all the stops on the title track; the wall of sound on the powerful "Running To You" is absolutely breathtaking though ends so suddenly you are left hanging in space waiting for more; and "Song Of Victory" is an energetic stomp with tight vocals and Gary Newman-type synthesizer work. The quieter moments work too with tasteful piano on "Come To Jesus" and the dénouement "We Cry Out" being a beautiful appeal for revival among God's people to spread to the nations of the world."

In a four-point review with twenty-five stars, Ganns Deen states, "Altogether a solid worship album whose energy and sincerity is surprising considering it is a studio album, not a live worship album. It comes highly recommended."

Russ Hutto, for The Worship Community, replies, "Overall, I really like the Nothing Is Impossible album. There is a reason that Planetshakers is one of the pioneers in fresh praise and worship these days, and they have again blazed a new trail to fresh, passionate, encouraging praise and worship."

== Track listing ==
No.	Title	Writer(s)	Length
1.	"Power"	Joth Hunt	3:34
2.	"Bring It On"	Joth Hunt	3:52
3.	"Give It Up"	Joth Hunt	3:37
4.	"Nothing Is Impossible" (feat. Israel Houghton)	Joth Hunt	4:04
5.	"Running To You"	Samantha Evans / Joth Hunt	7:22
6.	"You Are God"	Joth Hunt	6:20
7.	"No One Like You"	Joth Hunt	6:04
8.	"Favoured"	Sam Evans / Joth Hunt	6:25
9.	"Sound of Praise"	Andy Harrison	3:24
10.	"Song of Victory"	Joth Hunt	3:11
11.	"Hosanna"	Mike Pilmer	6:11
12.	"Come To Jesus"	Joth Hunt	7:36
13.	"We Cry Out"	Sam Evans & Joth Hunt	5:10
Total length:			66:44

== Personnel ==
Planetshakers

- Henry Seeley – vocals
- Sam Evans – vocals
- Mike "Rudy" Nikkerud – vocals
- Joe Vatucicila – vocals
- Joth Hunt – vocals, keyboards, guitars, bass, loops
- Dave Fallowfield – guitars
- Mark Peric – bass
- Andy Harrison – drums
- Mike Webber – drums

With:

- Israel Houghton – vocals on "Nothing Is Impossible"

== Production ==
- Russell Evans – executive producer
- Sam Evans – executive producer
- Joth Hunt – producer, engineer, mixing
- Ian Lee – additional recording, editing
- Mike "Rudy" Nikkerud – additional recording, editing
- Dan Shike – mastering at Tone and Volume Mastering (Nashville, Tennessee, USA)
- Mike Pilmer – artwork, design
- Cade Embery – cover design
