= Endless Praise: Live =

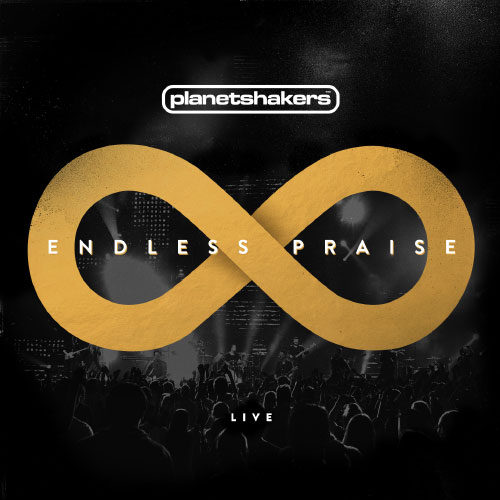

Live album by Planetshakers
- Released: March 11, 2014
- Recorded: 2013
- Venue: Hisense Arena, Melbourne, Australia
- Genre: Worship
- Length: 79:50
- Label: Planetshakers Ministries International, Integrity Music
- Producer: Joth Hunt

Planetshakers chronology
Limitless (2013)	Endless Praise: Live (2014)	Nada Es Imposible (2014)

Endless Praise: Live is a live album from Planetshakers. Planetshakers Ministries International and Integrity Music released the album on March 11, 2014.

== Critical reception ==
Professional ratings
Review scores
Source	Rating
CCM Magazine	4/5 stars
Cross Rhythms	8/10 squares
Louder Than the Music	4.5/5 stars
New Release Today	4/5 stars
Worship Leader	4.5/5 stars
Amazon.com	positive

Awarding the album four stars at CCM Magazine, Matt Conner states, "it’s a meaningful way to end another solid release." Andrea Hunter, giving the album four and a half stars for Worship Leader, writes, "rife with unbridled energy, seismic emotion, percolating power pop, rock and rhythms, electronic dance, and huge anthemic choruses, all deftly woven together with perfectly placed ballads, hasn't lost its sheen." Rating the album four stars by New Release Today, Sarah Fine describes, "Clever, bright and whimsical, while still remaining powerfully authentic, Endless Praise is a project not to be overlooked." Tim Holden, indicating in an eight out of ten review from Cross Rhythms, says, "this is still a good upbeat worship album that will bear more than a couple of repeat plays." Signaling in a four and a half star review for Louder Than the Music, Jono Davies states, "Planetshakers have put together another brilliant album mixing together epic dance songs with some wonderfully intimate worship moments." A staff editor at Amazon.com gave the album a relatively positive review, writing, Originating from the fastest-growing church in Australia, Planetshakers is making a name in the praise and worship world. Endless Praise, the long-awaited follow up to the groups project, Limitless."

== Awards and accolades ==
This album was No. 19 on the Worship Leader's Top 20 Albums of 2014 list.

The song, "Made for Worship", was No. 12 on the Worship Leader's Top 20 Worship Songs of 2014, So Far.

The song, "Made for Worship", was No. 11 on the Worship Leader's Top 20 Songs of 2014 list.

The video of the song "Endless Praise" was nominated for Dove Award Long Form Video of The Year 2014 at the 45th Annual GMA Dove Awards.

== Track listing ==
No.	Title	Writer(s)	Length
1.	"Endless Praise"	Joth Hunt / Andy Harrison	4:06
2.	"Turn It Up"	Andy Harrison	3:44
3.	"Dance"	Joth Hunt	3:52
4.	"No Other Name"	Joth Hunt	5:47
5.	"Made for Worship"	Andy Harrison / B.J. Pridham	6:13
6.	"Kiss Towards"	Natalie Ruiz / Andy Harrison / BJ Pridham	5:43
7.	"Unto God"	Joth Hunt	8:34
8.	"Praise You Lord"	B.J. Pridham / Joth Hunt	4:38
9.	"Oh Your Love"	Andy Harrison	4:12
10.	"Our God Reigns"	Samantha Evans / Joth Hunt	5:50
11.	"Set Me Ablaze"	Andy Harrison	10:57
12.	"Abide with Me"	Samantha Evans / Joth Hunt	5:35
13.	"We Are Free"	Joth Hunt	5:03
14.	"Leave Me Astounded" (Studio Version)	B.J. Pridham	5:36
Total length:			79:50

== Chart performance ==
Endless Praise: Live debuted at #4 on the iTunes Christian and Gospel Charts.

Chart (2014)	Peak position
US Heatseekers Albums (Billboard)	3
US Top Christian Albums (Billboard)	16
US Christian Album Sales (Billboard)	16
Australian Albums (ARIA)	30
US Top Current Albums (Billboard)	161
