= Limitless (Planetshakers album) =

Live album by Planetshakers
- Released: January 15, 2013
- Recorded: 2012
- Venue: Hisense Arena, Melbourne, Australia
- Genre: Worship
- Length: 79:09
- Label: Planetshakers Ministries International, Integrity
- Producer: Joth Hunt

Planetshakers chronology
Heal Our Land (2012)	Limitless (2013)	Endless Praise: Live (2014)

Limitless is a live album from Planetshakers, released by Planetshakers Ministries International and Integrity Music on January 15, 2013.

== Critical reception ==
Professional ratings
Review scores
Source	Rating
Cross Rhythms	8/10 squares
Indie Vision Music	2/5 stars
Louder Than the Music	4/5 stars
New Release Today	3.5/5 stars
Worship Leader	4.5/5 stars

Awarding the album four and a half stars from Worship Leader, Andrea Hunter states, "Planetshakers are back to engender seismic activity". Doug Holland, rating the album an eight out of ten for Cross Rhythms, writes, "These elements combine to deliver a collection which captures an intense, high-energy worship experience, with memorable anthems and hooky choruses." Giving the album three and a half stars at New Release Today, Jonathan J. Francesco says, "The music's safe and catchy, and often musically rewarding. It's a pleasantly surprising musical offering." Jono Davies, indicating in a four star review by Louder Than the Music, describes, "this is a solid worship album". Signaling in a two star review from Indie Vision Music, Jonathan Andre cautions, "Sadly, the rest of the album pales in comparison to my favourite standout track. Despite the great musical quality full of electronic beats and strong vibrant guitars; the lyrical depth with many of these tracks leaves much to be desired."

== Awards and accolades ==
The song, "The Anthem", was No. 18 on the Worship Leader's Top 20 Songs of 2013 list.

== Track listing ==
No.	Title	Writer(s)	Length
1.	"Let Praise Awaken"	Andy Harrison / Joth Hunt	4:07
2.	"Put Your Hands Up"	Joth Hunt	3:33
3.	"Limitless"	Joth Hunt	3:30
4.	"Your Name Brings Healing to Me"	B.J. Pridham	5:56
5.	"Great Is Your Love"	Joth Hunt / B.J. Pridham	9:22
6.	"This One Thing"	Samantha Evans / Joth Hunt	6:21
7.	"The Anthem (Full Song)"	Joth Hunt / Henry Seeley / Liz Webber	7:42
8.	"This Is the Day"	Andy Harrison / Joth Hunt / B.J. Pridham	4:40
9.	"I'm Gonna Praise"	Andy Harrison / Joth Hunt	4:33
10.	"O My Heart Sings"	B.J. Pridham	9:27
11.	"Rain"	Matt Garner / BJ Pridham	9:15
12.	"You Are Stronger"	Joth Hunt	6:31
13.	"Rise Up"	Joth Hunt / B.J. Pridham	4:12
Total length:			79:09

== Musicians ==
- Andy Harrison – drums
- Joth Hunt - vocals, electric guitar
- Samantha Evans - vocals
- Liz Webber - vocals
- Mike Webber - drums
- Scott Lim - keyboard
- Mark Peric - bass guitar
- Rudy Nikkerud - vocals
- Chelsi Nikkerud - vocals
- Brian Pridham Jr. - vocals, acoustic guitar
- Joe Vatucicila - vocals
- Natalie Ruiz - vocals
- Russell Evans - senior pastor

== Chart performance ==
Chart (2013)	Peak position
US Heatseekers Albums (Billboard)	8
US Christian Albums (Billboard)	17
US Christian Album Sales (Billboard)	17
