= Rudy Nikkerud =

Australian Pentecostal worship leader and singer

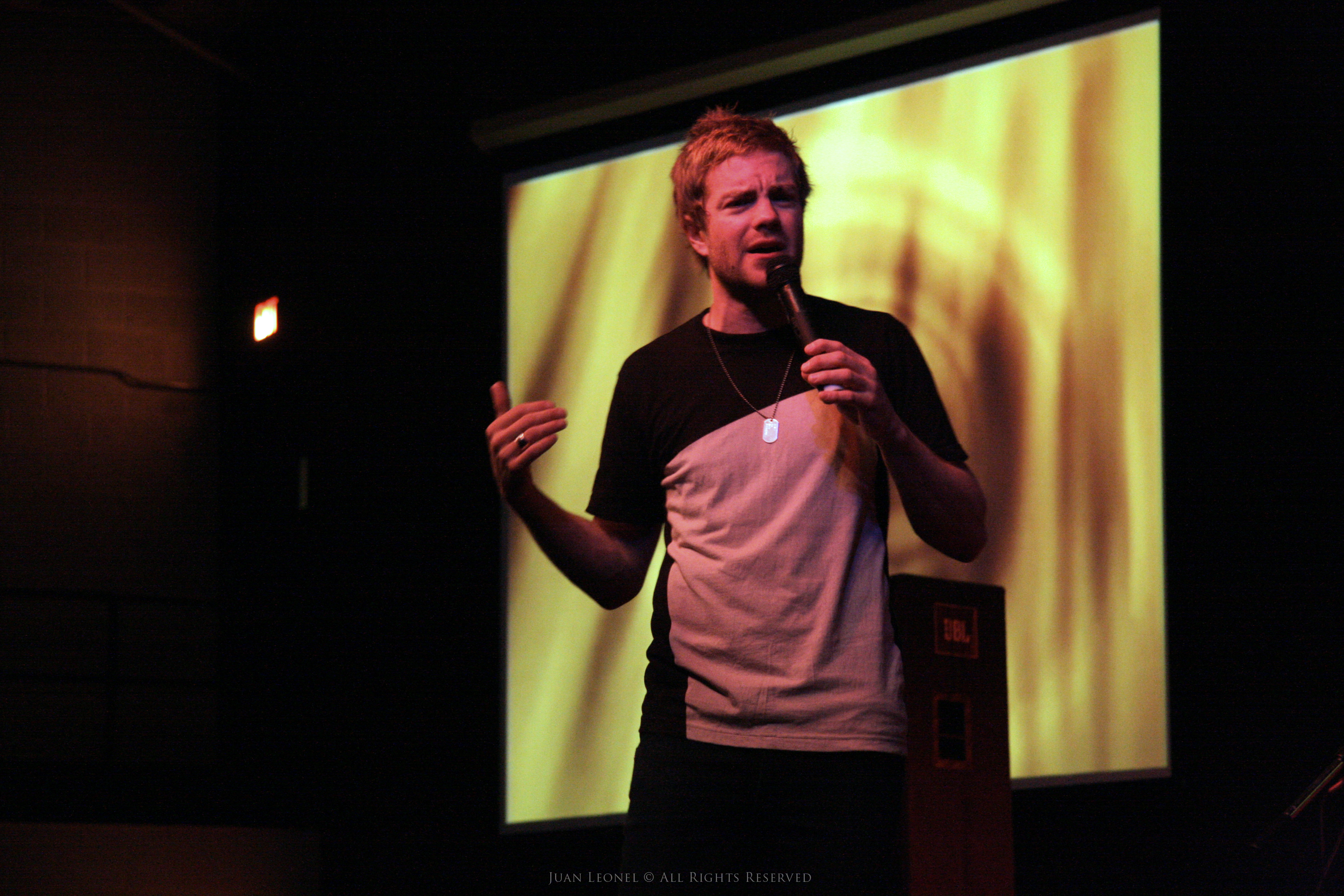
- Rudy Nikkerud performance at Liberty Christian Center

Background information
- Born: Michael Rudy Nikkerud; 13 March 1983 (age 43); Adelaide, Australia
- Origin: Melbourne, Australia
- Genres: Contemporary worship music, contemporary Christian music
- Occupations: Worship leader, singer, pastor
- Instruments: Vocals, acoustic guitar, bass guitar
- Years active: 2000–present
- Label: Planetshakers Ministries International

Michael Rudy Nikkerud (born 13 March 1983), known professionally as Rudy Nikkerud, is an Australian Pentecostal worship leader and former singer in the Planetshakers band.

== Biography ==
Rudy Nikkerud studied music and earned a BA from the University of Tasmania, Australia. At 16, Rudy dedicated his life to serving Jesus after a life-changing encounter with God at a Planetshakers conference. Later he moved to Melbourne, where he became part of Planetshakers Church at its inception. Rudy served as a pastor in the Planetshakers Church and was also a worship leader of the Planetshakers band until 2024.

== Personal life ==
Rudy Nikkerud married Chelsi Hardcastle (who also served as a worship leader at Planetshakers Church) on 1 November 2010, and together they have a daughter named Aria Lorraine.

== Discography ==
=== As featured artist ===
- 2018: I Am Loved – Sound of Praise (feat. Rudy Nikerrud).
